= List of football clubs in Greece =

This is a list of football clubs located in Greece and the leagues and divisions they are competing in.

== 2025–26 Super League Greece 1 ==
Locations of the 2025–26 Super League Greece 1 teams

Team	Location	Stadium
AEK Athens	Athens (Nea Filadelfeia)	Agia Sophia Stadium
A.E. Kifisia	Athens (Marousi)	Athens Olympic Stadium
AEL	Larissa	AEL FC Arena
Aris	Thessaloniki (Charilaou)	Kleanthis Vikelidis Stadium
Asteras Tripolis	Tripoli	Theodoros Kolokotronis Stadium
Atromitos	Athens (Peristeri)	Peristeri Stadium
Levadiakos	Livadeia	Levadia Municipal Stadium
OFI	Heraklion	Pankritio Stadium
Olympiacos	Piraeus	Karaiskakis Stadium
Panathinaikos	Athens (Ampelokipoi)	Leoforos Alexandras Stadium
Panetolikos	Agrinio	Panetolikos Stadium
Panserraikos	Serres	Serres Municipal Stadium
PAOK	Thessaloniki (Toumba)	Toumba Stadium
Volos	Volos	Panthessaliko Stadium

== Super League Greece 2 ==
Locations of the 2025–26 Super League 2 clubs

Team	City	Stadium
Anagennisi Karditsa	Karditsa	Karditsa Municipal Stadium
Asteras Tripolis B	Tripoli	Tripoli Municipal Stadium
Athens Kallithea	Kallithea	Grigoris Lamprakis Stadium
Chania	Chania	Perivolia Municipal Stadium
Egaleo	Aigaleo	Stavros Mavrothalassitis Stadium
Hellas Syros	Ermoupoli	Ermoupoli Municipal Stadium
Ilioupoli	Ilioupoli	Ilioupoli Municipal Stadium
Iraklis	Thessaloniki	Kaftanzoglio Stadium
Kalamata	Kalamata	Kalamata Municipal Stadium
Kampaniakos	Chalastra	Chalastra Municipal Stadium
Kavala	Kavala	Anthi Karagianni Stadium
Lamia	Lamia	Lamia Municipal Stadium
Makedonikos	Efkarpia	Makedonikos Stadium
Marko	Markopoulo	Markopoulo Municipal Stadium
Nestos Chrysoupoli	Chrysoupoli	Chrysoupoli Municipal Stadium
Niki Volos	Volos	Pantelis Magoulas Stadium
Olympiacos B	Piraeus	Rentis Training Centre
Panionios	Nea Smyrni	Nea Smyrni Stadium
PAOK B	Efkarpia	Makedonikos Stadium
PAS Giannina	Ioannina	Zosimades Stadium

== Gamma Ethniki ==
=== Group 1 ===
Team	Location
Alexandroupoli	Alexandroupoli
Apollon Kalamarias	Kalamaria
Apollon Krya Vrysi	Krya Vrysi
Apollon Paralimnio	Paralimnio
Aris Avato	Avato
Aris Piges	Kavala
Chaniotis	Chaniotis
Evosmos	Evosmos
Iraklis Ammoudia	Serres
Kilkisiakos	Kilkis
Moudania	Nea Moudania
Nestos Chrysoupoli	Chrysoupoli
Orestis Orestiada	Orestiada
Panthrakikos	Komotini
PAOK Kristoni	Kristoni
PAO Pontioi Nea Amisos	Drama
Poseidon Nea Michaniona	Michaniona
Thermaikos	Thermi

=== Group 2 ===
Team	Location
Aiginiakos	Aiginio
Alexandreia	Alexandreia
Amvrakikos Vonitsa	Vonitsa
Anagennisi Arta	Arta
Anagennisi Karditsa	Karditsa
Anthoupoli	Larissa
Aris Filiates	Filiates
Asteras Petriti	Petriti
Atromitos Palamas	Palamas
Ermis Amyntaio	Amyntaio
Kozani	Kozani
Olympiacos Volos	Volos
Pierikos	Katerini
Svoronos	Svoronos
Tilikratis	Lefkada
Thesprotos	Igoumenitsa
Trikala	Trikala
Zakynthos	Zakynthos

=== Group 3 ===
Team	Location
AER Afantou	Afantou
Aigeas Plomari	Plomari
Amarynthiakos	Amarynthos
Apollon Efpalio	Efpalio
Asteras Stavros	Stavros
Hellas Syros	Ermoupoli
Korinthos	Corinth
Loutraki	Loutraki
Malesina 2008	Malesina
Miltiadis Pyrgos Trifilia	Pyrgos Trifilia
Mykonos	Mykonos
Nea Artaki	Nea Artaki
Pangitheatikos	Gytheio
Panegialios	Aigio
Pannafpliakos	Nafplio
Rodos	Rhodes

=== Group 4 ===
Team	Location
Agios Nikolaos	Agios Nikolaos
Aris Petroupoli	Petroupoli
Asteras Kaisariani	Kaisariani
Asteras Vari	Vari
Atsalenios	Heraklion (Atsalenio neighborhood)
Ethnikos Piraeus	Piraeus
Giouchtas	Archanes
Haidari	Haidari
Ilisiakos	Athens (Ilisia neighborhood)
Karavas Piraeus	Piraeus (Palaia Kokkinia neighborhood)
Mandraikos	Mandra
Marko	Markopoulo
Nea Ionia	Nea Ionia
Rethymniakos	Rethymno
Thiva	Thiva
Thyella Rafina	Rafina (Diastavrosi neighborhood)
Tympaki	Tympaki

== Other clubs ==
Amateur clubs participating in local championships. Italic indicates inactive or defunct club.

Club	Greek name	Settlement	Regional unit	Region	Current status
Achaiki	Αχαϊκή	Kato Achaia	Achaea	West Greece	
Achaios Saravali	Αχαιός Σαραβαλίου	Saravali	Achaea	West Greece	
Acharnaikos	Αχαρναϊκός	Acharnes	East Attica	Attica	
Achilleas Domokos	Αχιλλέας Δομοκού	Domokos	Phthiotis	Central Greece	
Achilleas Farsala	Αχιλλέας Φαρσάλων	Farsala	Larissa	Thessaly	
Achilleas Kamares	Αχιλλέας Καμαρών	Kamares	Achaea	West Greece	
Achilleas Kato Acharnes	Αχιλλέας Κάτω Αχαρνών	Acharnes	East Attica	Attica	
Achilleas Neokaisareia	Αχιλλέας Νεοκαισάρειας	Neokaisareia	Pieria	Central Macedonia	
Achilleas Neokastro	Αχιλλέας Νεοκάστρου	Neokastro	Imathia	Central Macedonia	
Achilleas Paraliou Astrous	Αχιλλέας Παράλιου Άστρους	Paralio Astros	Arcadia	Peloponnese	
Achilleas Petra	Αχιλλέας Πέτρας	Petra	Lesbos	North Aegean	Lesbos B Division
Achilleas Triandria	Αχιλλέας Τριανδρίας	Triandria	Thessaloniki	Central Macedonia	
AE Ambelokipon Dramas	Α.Ε. Αμπελοκήπων Δράμας	Drama	Drama	East Macedonia and Thrace	
AE Chalandriou	Α.Ε. Χαλανδρίου	Chalandri	North Athens	Attica	
AE Charavgi Asteras Keratsiniou	Α.Ε. Χαραυγή Αστέρας Κερατσινίου	Keratsini	Piraeus	Attica	
AE Chatzikyriakiou	Α.Ε. Χατζηκυριάκειου	Piraeus	Piraeus	Attica	
AE Didymoteichou	Α.Ε. Διδυμοτείχου	Didymoteicho	Evros	East Macedonia and Thrace	
AE Dilesiou	Α.Ε. Δηλεσίου	Oinofyta	Boeotia	Central Greece	
AE Dimitsanas	Α.Ε. Δημητσάνας	Dimitsana	Arcadia	Peloponnese	
AE Dimou Asopou	Α.Ε. Δήμου Ασωπού	Asopos	Laconia	Peloponnese	
AE Eleftheroupolis	Α.Ε. Ελευθερούπολης	Nea Ionia	North Athens	Attica	
AE Evosmou	Α.Ε. Ευόσμου	Evosmos	Thessaloniki	Central Macedonia	
AE Farkadona	Α.Ε. Φαρκαδόνα	Farkadona	Trikala	Thessaly	
AE Geraka	Α.Ε. Γέρακα	Gerakas	East Attica	Attica	
AE Giannena	Α.Ε. Γιάννενα	Ioannina	Ioannina	Epirus	
AE Iliou	Α.Ε. Ιλίου	Ilio	West Athens	Attica	
AE Irakleio	Α.Ε. Ηράκλειο	Irakleio	North Athens	Attica	
AE Kalampakiou	Α.Ε. Καλαμπακίου	Kalampaki	Drama	East Macedonia and Thrace	
AE Karitsas	Α.Ε. Καρίτσας	Karitsa	Pieria	Central Macedonia	
AE Karlovasiou	Α.E. Καρλοβασίου	Karlovasi	Samos	North Aegean	
AE Katsamba	Α.Ε. Κατσαμπά	Heraklion	Heraklion	Crete	
AE Kos	Α.Ε. Κως	Kos	Kos	South Aegean	Dodekanisos A Division
AE Limnos	Α.Ε. Λήμνος	Myrina	Lemnos	North Aegean	
AE Longanikou	Α.Ε. Λογκανίκου	Longanikos	Laconia	Peloponnese	
AE Mariou	Α.Ε. Μαρίου	Mari	Arcadia	Peloponnese	
AE Mavros Aetos - Olympiada	Α.Ε. Μαύρος Αετός - Ολυμπιάδα	Keratsini	Piraeus	Attica	
AE Menidiou	Α.Ε. Μενιδίου	Acharnes	East Attica	Attica	
AE Messolonghiou	Α.Ε. Μεσολογγίου	Missolonghi	Aetolia-Acarnania	West Greece	
AE Metamorfosis	Α.Ε. Μεταμόρφωσης	Metamorfosi	North Athens	Attica	
AE Mouzakiou Argitheas	Α.Ε. Μουζακίου Αργιθέας	Mouzaki	Karditsa	Thessaly	
AE Mylopotamos	Α.Ε. Μυλοποτάμου	Perama	Rethymno	Crete	
AE Neapolis	Α.Ε. Νεάπολης	Neapoli	Lasithi	Crete	
AE Nikaia	Α.Ε. Νίκαια	Nikaia	Piraeus	Attica	
AE Orchomenou	Α.Ε. Ορχομενού	Orchomenos	Boeotia	Central Greece	
AE Peramatos	Α.Ε. Περάματος	Perama	Piraeus	Attica	
AE Perdikka	Α.Ε. Περδίκκα	Perdikkas	Kozani	West Macedonia	
AE Peristeriou	Α.Ε. Περιστερίου	Peristeri	West Athens	Attica	
AE Piereon 2004	Α.Ε. Πιερέων 2004	Melissokomio	Kavala	East Macedonia and Thrace	
AE Polykastrou	Α.Ε. Πολυκάστρου	Polykastro	Kilkis	Central Macedonia	
AE Pontion Vatolakkou	Α.Ε. Ποντίων Βατολάκκου	Grevena	Grevena	West Macedonia	
AE Pylaias	Α.Ε. Πυλαίας	Pylaia	Thessaloniki	Central Macedonia	
AE Sparti	Α.Ε. Σπάρτη	Sparta	Laconia	Peloponnese	
AE Thyellas - Achillea Korydallou	Α.Ε. Θύελλας - Αχιλλέα Κορυδαλλού	Korydallos	Piraeus	Attica	
AE Vathyllou-Pansamiakou	A.E. Βαθύλλου - Πανσαμιακού	Vathy	Samos	North Aegean	
AE Zefyriou	Α.Ε. Ζεφυρίου	Zefyri	West Attica	Attica	
AE Zefyros	Α.Ε. Ζέφυρος	Egaleo	West Athens	Attica	
AEEK SYNKA	Α.Ε.Ε.Κ. ΣΥΝ.ΚΑ.	Chania	Chania	Crete	
AEES Korakovouniou	Α.Ε.Ε.Σ. Κορακοβουνίου	Korakovouni	Arcadia	Peloponnese	
AEK Argos	Α.Ε.Κ. Άργους	Argos	Argolis	Peloponnese	
AEK Kalamata	Α.Ε.Κ. Καλαμάτας	Kalamata	Messenia	Peloponnese	
AEK Patras	Α.Ε.Κ. Πατρών	Patras	Achaea	West Greece	
AEK Tripoli	Α.Ε.Κ. Τρίπολης	Tripoli	Arcadia	Peloponnese	
AEL Kallonis	Α.Ε.Λ. Καλλονής	Mytilene	Lesbos	North Aegean	dissolved
AER Afandou	Α.Ε.Ρ. Αφάντου	Afandou	Rhodes	South Aegean	Dodekanisos A Division
Aetos Alpochori	Αετός Αλποχωρίου	Alpochori	Elis	West Greece	
Aetos Anogeia	Αετός Ανωγείων	Anogeia	Rethymno	Crete	
Aetos Diasellou	Αετός Διασέλλου	Diasello	Arta	Epirus	merged with AO Artas and Omonia Petras and formed Karaiskakis
Aetos Kentrou Pinias	Αετός Κέντρου Πηνείας	Kalyvia	Elis	West Greece	
Aetos Korydallos	Αετός Κορυδαλλού	Korydallos	Piraeus	Attica	
Aetos Kryoneri	Αετός Κρυονερίου	Kryoneri	Corinthia	Peloponnese	
Aetos Loutra	Αετός Λουτρών	Loutra	Lesbos	North Aegean	
Aetos Makrychori	Αετός Μακρυχωρίου	Makrychori	Larissa	Thessaly	
Aetos Orfanou	Αετός Ορφανού	Ofrynio	Kavala	East Macedonia and Thrace	
Aetos Patras	Αετός Πατρών	Patras	Achaea	West Greece	
Aetos Pikermi	Αετός Πικερμίου	Pikermi	East Attica	Attica	
Aetos Skydra	Αετός Σκύδρας	Skydra	Pella	Central Macedonia	
Aetos Varvara	Αετός Βαρβάρας	Varvara	Chalkidiki	Central Macedonia	
Afovos	Άφοβος	Sepolia	Central Athens	Attica	
Agia Eleousa	Αγία Ελεούσα	Agia Varvara	West Athens	Attica	
Agioi Anargyroi	Άγιοι Ανάργυροι	Agioi Anargyroi	West Athens	Attica	
Agios Dimitrios	Άγιος Δημήτριος	Agios Dimitrios	South Athens	Attica	
Agios Dimitrios Patras	Άγιος Δημήτριος Πατρών	Patras	Achaea	West Greece	
Agios Dimitrios Pournari	Άγιος Δημήτριος Πουρναρίου	Pournari	Elis	West Greece	
Agios Georgios Platy	Άγιος Γεώργιος Πλατέος	Platy	Lemnos	North Aegean	
Agrotis Lianokladi	Αγρότης Λιανοκλαδίου	Leianokladi	Phthiotis	Central Greece	
Aiantas Evrota	Αίαντας Ευρώτα	Skala	Laconia	Peloponnese	
Aias Athens	Αίας Αθηνών	Rizoupoli	Central Athens	Attica	
Aias Evosmos	Αίας Ευόσμου	Evosmos	Thessaloniki	Central Macedonia	
Aias Mytilene	Αίας Μυτιλήνης	Mytilene	Lesbos	North Aegean	inactive
Aias Paralias Aspropyrgou	Αίας Παραλίας Ασπροπύργου	Aspropyrgos	West Attica	Attica	
Aias Salamina	Αίας Σαλαμίνας	Salamina	Islands	Attica	
Aigeas Plomari	Αιγέας Πλωμαρίου	Plomari	Lesbos	North Aegean	Lesbos A Division
Aigeiros Mistegna	Αίγειρος Μιστεγνών	Mistegna	Lesbos	North Aegean	Lesbos B Division
Aiginiakos	Αιγινιακός	Aiginio	Pieria	Central Macedonia	dissolved
Aimos Agias Triadas	Αίμος Αγίας Τριάδας	Petroupoli	West Athens	Attica	
Aiolos Karpenisi	Αίολος Καρπενησίου	Karpenisi	Evrytania	Central Greece	
Aiolos Pyrgos	Αίολος Πύργου	Pyrgos	Elis	West Greece	
Aitos Plaka-Panagia	Αητός Πλάκας - Παναγίας	Plaka-Panagia	Lemnos	North Aegean	
Aittitos Spata	Αήττητος Σπάτων	Spata	East Attica	Attica	
Ajax Tavros	Άγιαξ Ταύρου	Tavros	South Athens	Attica	
Akadimia Lechaiou	Ακαδημία Λεχαίου	Lechaio	Corinthia	Peloponnese	
Akadimia Platamona	Ακαδημία Πλαταμώνα	Platamon	Pieria	Central Macedonia	absorbed by Aiginiakos
Akanthos Ierissou	Άκανθος Ιερισσού	Ierissos	Chalkidiki	Central Macedonia	
Akratitos Ano Liosia	Ακράτητος Άνω Λιοσίων	Ano Liosia	West Attica	Attica	
Akritas Kato Nevrokopi	Ακρίτας Κάτω Νευροκοπίου	Kato Nevrokopi	Drama	East Macedonia and Thrace	
Akrites Sykies	Ακρίτες Συκεών	Sykies	Thessaloniki	Central Macedonia	
Alfeionis Alfeiousa	Αλφειονίς Αλφειούσης	Alfeiousa	Elis	West Greece	
Alfeios Epitalio	Αλφειός Επιταλίου	Epitalio	Elis	West Greece	
Alkiviadis Kato Tritos	Αλκιβιάδης Κάτω Τρίτους	Kato Tritos	Lesbos	North Aegean	Lesbos B Division
Almopos Aridea	Αλμωπός Αριδαίας	Aridaea	Pella	Central Macedonia	expelled
Alsoupoli	Αλσούπολη	Nea Ionia	North Athens	Attica	
Amaliada 2008	Αμαλιάδα 2008	Amaliada	Elis	West Greece	
Amfiali	Αμφιάλη	Piraeus	Piraeus	Attica	
Αmfilochos	Αμφίλοχος	Amfilochia	Aetolia-Acarnania	West Greece	merged with Panamvrakikos Bouka and formed Neos Amfilochos
Amilla Agios Ioannis	Άμιλλα Αγίου Ιωάννη	Agios Ioannis	Laconia	Peloponnese	
Amilla Peristeri	Άμιλλα Περιστερίου	Peristeri	West Athens	Attica	
Ampelakiakos	Αμπελακιακός	Ampelakia	Islands	Attica	
Ampelokipi	Αμπελόκηποι	Ampelokipi	Central Athens	Attica	
Ampeloniakos	Αμπελωνιακός	Ampelonas	Larissa	Thessaly	
AMS Galatinis	Α.Μ.Σ. Γαλατινής	Galatini	Kozani	West Macedonia	
AMS Vrasion	Α.Μ.Σ. Βρασιών	Agios Andreas	Arcadia	Peloponnese	
Amvrakia Kostakion	Αμβρακία Κωστακιών	Kostakioi	Arta	Epirus	
Amvrakikos Loutro	Αμβρακικός Λουτρού	Loutro	Aetolia-Acarnania	West Greece	
Amvrysseas Distomo	Αμβρυσσέας Διστόμου	Distomo	Boeotia	Central Greece	
Amykliakos	Αμυκλιακός	Amykles	Laconia	Peloponnese	
Anagennisi Arta	Αναγέννηση Άρτας	Arta	Arta	Epirus	
Anagennisi Epanomi	Αναγέννηση Επανομής	Epanomi	Thessaloniki	Central Macedonia	
Anagennisi Gera	Αναγέννηση Γέρας	Papados	Lesbos	North Aegean	Lesbos A Division
Anagennisi Ierapetra	Αναγέννηση Ιεράπετρας	Ierapetra	Lasithi	Crete	
Anagennisi Kiato	Αναγέννηση Κιάτου	Kiato	Corinthia	Peloponnese	
Anagennisi Moschato	Αναγέννηση Μοσχάτου	Moschato	South Athens	Attica	
Anagennisi Naxos	Αναγέννηση Νάξου	Agios Arsenios	Naxos	South Aegean	
Anagennisi Patras	Αναγέννηση Πατρών	Patras	Achaea	West Greece	
Anagennisi Perivoli	Αναγέννηση Περιβολίου	Perivoli	Corfu	Ionian Islands	
Anagennisi Petroupoli	Αναγέννηση Πετρούπολης	Petroupoli	West Athens	Attica	
Anagennisi Plagia	Αναγέννηση Πλαγιάς	Plagia	Kilkis	Central Macedonia	
Anagennisi Thalassia	Αναγέννηση Θαλασσιάς	Thalassia	Xanthi	East Macedonia and Thrace	
Anaxos	Άναξος	Skoutaros	Lesbos	North Aegean	Lesbos B Division
Andronikas Parakoila	Ανδρονικάς Παρακοίλων	Parakoila	Lesbos	North Aegean	Lesbos A Division
Androutsos Gravia	Ανδρούτσος Γραβιάς	Gravia	Phocis	Central Greece	
Ano Neapoli	Άνω Νεάπολη	Nikaia	Piraeus	Attica	
Antagoras Kos	Ανταγόρας Κω	Kos	Kos	South Aegean	
Anthoupoli	Ανθούπολη	Peristeri	West Athens	Attica	
AO Agiou Georgiou	Α.Ο. Αγίου Γεωργίου	Agios Georgios	Elis	West Greece	
AO Agiou Dimitriou	Α.Ο. Αγίου Δημητρίου	Piraeus	Piraeus	Attica	
AO Agiou Vasiliou	Α.Ο. Αγίου Βασιλείου	Agios Vasilios	Laconia	Peloponnese	
AO Anatoli	Α.Ο. Ανατολής	Ioannina	Ioannina	Epirus	
AO Angelonas	Α.Ο. Αγγελώνας	Angelona	Laconia	Peloponnese	
AO Anixis	Α.Ο. Άνοιξης	Anixi	East Attica	Attica	
AO Ano Syros	Α.Ο. Άνω Σύρου	Ano Syros	Syros	South Aegean	
AO Anogi	Α.Ο. Ανωγής	Agia Thekli	Cephalonia	Ionian Islands	
AO Artemis	Α.Ο. Άρτεμις	Artemida	East Attica	Attica	
AO Asprokampou	Α.Ο. Ασπρόκαμπου	Asprokampos	Corinthia	Peloponnese	
AO Avlonos 1958	Α.Ο. Αυλώνος 1958	Avlonas	East Attica	Attica	
AO Chalkidon	Α.Ο. Χαλκηδών	Nikaia	Piraeus	Attica	
AO Chania	Α.Ο. Χανιά	Chania	Chania	Crete	merged with Kissamikos and formed Chania
AO Chrysafon	Α.Ο. Χρυσάφων	Chrysafa	Laconia	Peloponnese	
AO Dafniou	Α.Ο. Δαφνίου	Dafni	Laconia	Peloponnese	
AO Damastas	Α.Ο. Δαμάστας	Damasta	Heraklion	Crete	
AO Dikaiou	Α.Ο. Δικαίου	Dikaios	Kos	South Aegean	
AO Dionysou	Α.Ο. Διονύσου	Dionysos	East Attica	Attica	
AO Eikosimias	Α.Ο. Εικοσιμίας	Vlachata	Cephalonia	Ionian Islands	
AO Filotheis	A.O. Φιλοθέης	Filothei	Arta	Epirus	
AO Floriadas	Α.Ο. Φλωριάδας	Floriada	Aetolia-Acarnania	West Greece	
AO Glykon Neron	Α.Ο. Γλυκών Νερών	Glyka Nera	East Attica	Attica	
AO I Thiva	Α.Ο. Η Θήβα	Thebes	Boeotia	Central Greece	
AO Iliou	Α.Ο. Ιλίου	Ilio	West Athens	Attica	
AO Kalamakiou	Α.Ο. Καλαμακίου	Kalamaki	South Athens	Attica	
AO Kamenon Vourlon	Α.Ο. Καμένων Βούρλων	Kamena Vourla	Phthiotis	Central Greece	
AO Karava	Α.Ο. Καραβά	Piraeus	Piraeus	Attica	
AO Kassiopis	Α.Ο. Κασσιόπης	Kassiopi	Corfu	Ionian Islands	merged with AO Kerkyra and formed PAE Kerkyra
AO Kastellas	Α.Ο. Καστέλλας	Piraeus	Piraeus	Attica	
AO Kastrou	Α.Ο. Κάστρου	Kastro	Elis	West Greece	
AO Katastariou Zakynthou	Α.Ο. Κατασταρίου Ζακύνθου	Katastari	Zakynthos	Ionian Islands	
AO Kardias	Α.Ο. Καρδίας	Kardia	Thessaloniki	Central Macedonia	
AO Karditsas	Α.Ο. Καρδίτσας	Karditsa	Karditsa	Thessaly	
AO Kaspakas	Α.Ο. Κάσπακας	Kaspakas	Lemnos	North Aegean	
AO Kerateas	Α.Ο. Κερατέας	Keratea	East Attica	Attica	
AO Kerkyra	Α.Ο. Κέρκυρα	Corfu	Corfu	Ionian Islands	
AO Kofon	Α.Ο. Κωφών	Akadimia Platonos	Central Athens	Attica	
AO Korydallos	Α.Ο. Κορυδαλλός	Korydallos	Piraeus	Attica	
AO Koutsocheras	Α.Ο. Κουτσοχέρας	Koutsochera	Elis	West Greece	
ΑΟ Kouvara	Α.Ο. Κουβαρά	Kouvaras	East Attica	Attica	
AO Krokeon	Α.Ο. Κροκεών	Krokees	Laconia	Peloponnese	
AO Kymi	Α.Ο. Κύμη	Kymi	Euboea	Central Greece	
AO Kyparissias	Α.Ο. Κυπαρισσίας	Kyparissia	Messenia	Peloponnese	
AO Lafkas	Α.Ο. Λαύκας	Lafka	Corinthia	Peloponnese	
AO Lechaiou	Α.Ο. Λεχαίου	Lechaio	Corinthia	Peloponnese	
AO Longastras	Α.Ο. Λογγάστρας	Longastra	Laconia	Peloponnese	
AO Loutraki	Α.Ο. Λουτράκι	Loutraki	Corinthia	Peloponnese	
AO Lykoporias	Α.Ο. Λυκοποριάς	Lykoporia	Corinthia	Peloponnese	
AO Lykovrisis	Α.Ο. Λυκόβρυσης	Lykovrysi	North Athens	Attica	
AO Makrision	Διγενής Χαριάς	Charia	Elis	West Greece	
AO Mapsou	Α.Ο. Μακρισίων	Makrisia	Corinthia	Peloponnese	
AO Mesotopos	Α.Ο. Μεσοτόπου	Mesotopos	Lesbos	North Aegean	Lesbos A Division
AO Mimas Mikrasiatiki	Α.Ο. Μίμας Μικρασιατική	Megara	West Attica	Attica	
AO Mykonou	Α.Ο. Μυκόνου	Mykonos	Mykonos	South Aegean	merged with Ano Mera and formed AE Mykonou
AO Myriki	Α.Ο. Μυρίκη	Myriki	Evrytania	Central Greece	
AO Myrinis	Α.Ο. Μυρίνης	Myrina	Karditsa	Thessaly	
AO Myrteas	Α.Ο. Μυρτέας	Myrtia	Laconia	Peloponnese	
AO Neas Artakis	Α.Ο. Νέας Αρτάκης	Nea Artaki	Euboea	Central Greece	
AO Neas Chilis	Α.Ο. Νέας Χηλής	Alexandroupoli	Evros	East Macedonia and Thrace	
AO Neas Ionias	Α.Ο. Νέας Ιωνίας	Nea Ionia	North Athens	Attica	
AO Neon Argyroupolis	Α.Ο. Νέων Αργυρούπολης	Argyroupoli	South Athens	Attica	
AO Neon Tripolis	Α.Ο. Νέων Τρίπολης	Tripoli	Arcadia	Peloponnese	
AO Nestanis	Α.Ο. Νεστάνης	Nestani	Arcadia	Peloponnese	
AO Paianias	Α.Ο. Παιανίας	Paiania	East Attica	Attica	
AO Palaiochoras	Α.Ο. Παλαιοχώρας	Palaiochora	Chania	Crete	
AO Pangratiou	Α.Ο. Παγκρατίου	Pangrati	Central Athens	Attica	
AO Paradisou	Α.Ο. Παραδείσου	Marousi	North Athens	Attica	
AO Perachoras	Α.Ο. Περαχώρας	Perachora	Corinthia	Peloponnese	
AO Peristeriou	Α.Ο. Περιστερίου	Peristeri	West Athens	Attica	
AO Pirea	Α.Ο. Πειραιά	Piraeus	Piraeus	Attica	
AO Platania	Α.Ο. Πλατανιά	Platanias	Chania	Crete	dissolved
AO Polichnitou	Α.Ο. Πολιχνίτου	Polichnitos	Lesbos	North Aegean	Lesbos B Division
AO Potamias	Α.Ο. Ποταμιάς	Megalo Chorio	Evrytania	Central Greece	
AO Pronni	Α.Ο. Πρόννοι	Eleios-Pronnoi	Cephalonia	Ionian Islands	
AO Psilalonia	Α.Ο. Ψηλαλώνια	Psilalonia	Achaea	West Greece	
AO Ramnous	Α.Ο. Ραμνούς	Grammatiko	East Attica	Attica	
AO Sellanon	Α.Ο. Σελλάνων	Proastio	Karditsa	Thessaly	
AO Sirina	Α.Ο. Σειρήνα	Grevena	Grevena	West Macedonia	
AO Spathovouniou	Α.Ο. Σπαθοβουνίου	Spathovouni	Corinthia	Peloponnese	
AO Stamatas	Α.Ο. Σταμάτας	Stamata	East Attica	Attica	
AO Stylidas	Α.Ο. Στυλίδας	Stylida	Phthiotis	Central Greece	
AO Sykaminou	Α.Ο. Συκαμίνου	Sykamino	East Attica	Attica	
AO Syros	Α.Ο. Σύρου	Ermoupoli	Syros	South Aegean	
AO Tavropos	Α.Ο. Ταυρωπός	Sofades	Karditsa	Thessaly	
AO Tegeas	Α.Ο. Τεγέας	Alea	Arcadia	Peloponnese	
AO Thanos	Α.Ο. Θάνος	Thanos	Lemnos	North Aegean	
AO Tsilivi	Α.Ο. Τσιλιβή	Planos	Zakynthos	Ionian Islands	
AO Vasilikon "I Pyrraii"	Α.Ο. Βασιλικών "Οι Πυρραίοι"	Vasilika	Lesbos	North Aegean	Lesbos A Division
AO Vouliagmenis	Α.Ο. Βουλιαγμένης	Vouliagmeni	East Attica	Attica	
AO Zevgolatiou	Α.Ο. Ζευγολατιού	Zevgolateio	Corinthia	Peloponnese	
AOK Falirou	Α.Ο.Κ. Φαλήρου	Tzitzifies	South Athens	Attica	
AOP Zakynthiakos	Α.Ο.Π. Ζακυνθιακός	Zakynthos	Zakynthos	Ionian Islands	merged with Zakynthos
AOT Alimos	Α.Ο.Τ. Αλίμου	Alimos	South Athens	Attica	
APE Langada	Α.Π.Ε. Λαγκαδά	Langadas	Thessaloniki	Central Macedonia	
Apessas Chalkio	Απέσσας Χαλκείου	Chalkio	Corinthia	Peloponnese	
APO Atalanti	Α.Π.Ο. Αταλάντη	Atalanti	Phthiotis	Central Greece	
APO Ierapoli	Α.Π.Ο. Ιεράπολη	Egaleo	West Athens	Attica	
APO Kryoneriou	Α.Π.Ο. Κρυονερίου	Kryoneri	East Attica	Attica	
APO Neas Smyrnis	Α.Π.Ο. Νέας Σμύρνης	Nea Smyrni	South Athens	Attica	
APO Velies	Α.Π.Ο. Βελιών	Velies	Laconia	Peloponnese	
APOK To Velouchi	Α.Π.Ο.Κ. Το Βελούχι	Karpenisi	Evrytania	Central Greece	
Apollon Arnaia	Απόλλων Αρναίας	Arnaia	Chalkidiki	Central Macedonia	
Apollon Chalandri	Απόλλων Χαλανδρίου	Chalandri	North Athens	Attica	
Apollon Dafia	Απόλλων Δαφίων	Kalloni	Lesbos	North Aegean	Lesbos A Division
Apollon Efpalio	Απόλλων Ευπαλίου	Efpalio	Phocis	Central Greece	
Apollon Eretria	Απόλλων Ερέτριας	Eretria	Euboea	Central Greece	
Apollon Kalamata	Απόλλων Καλαμάτας	Kalamata	Messenia	Peloponnese	
Apollon Krya Vrysi	Απόλλων Κρύας Βρύσης	Krya Vrysi	Pella	Central Macedonia	
Apollon Makrychori	Απόλλων Μακρυχωρίου	Makrychori	Karditsa	Thessaly	
Apollon Nea Figaleia	Απόλλων Νέας Φιγαλείας	Nea Figaleia	Elis	West Greece	
Apollon Larissa	Απόλλων Λάρισας	Larissa	Larissa	Thessaly	
Apollon Patras	Απόλλων Πατρών	Patras	Achaea	West Greece	
Apollon Petalidi	Απόλλων Πεταλιδίου	Petalidi	Messenia	Peloponnese	
Apollon Pontion Aspropyrgou	Απόλλων Ποντίων Ασπροπύργου	Aspropyrgos	West Attica	Attica	
Apollon Tyros	Απόλλων Τυρού	Tyros	Arcadia	Peloponnese	
Apollon Xirokampi	Απόλλων Ξηροκαμπίου	Agios Nikolaos	Laconia	Peloponnese	
APS Agianni	Α.Π.Σ. Αγιάννη	Agios Ioannis	Corinthia	Peloponnese	
Argo Megara	Αργώ Μεγάρων	Megara	West Attica	Attica	
Argonaftes Myrina	Αργοναύτες Μύρινας	Myrina	Lemnos	North Aegean	
Argonaftis Piraeus	Αργοναύτης Πειραιά	Piraeus	Piraeus	Attica	
Arion Mithymna	Αρίων Μήθυμνας	Mithymna	Lesbos	North Aegean	Lesbos A Division
Arion Palaiokipos	Αρίων Παλαιοκήπου	Palaiokipos	Lesbos	North Aegean	Lesbos B Division
Arion Ymittos	Αρίων Υμηττού	Agios Artemios	Central Athens	Attica	
Aris Agios Konstantinos	Άρης Αγίου Κωνσταντίνου	Agios Konstantinos	Phthiotis	Central Greece	
Aris Aitoliko	Άρης Αιτωλικού	Aitoliko	Aetolia-Acarnania	West Greece	
Aris Akropotamos	Άρης Ακροποτάμου	Akropotamos	Kavala	East Macedonia and Thrace	
Aris Amfiali	Άρης Αμφιάλης	Keratsini	Piraeus	Attica	
Aris Cholargos	Άρης Χολαργού	Cholargos	North Athens	Attica	
Aris Dimitra	Άρης Δήμητρας	Dimitra	Elis	West Greece	
Aris Drama	Άρης Δράμας	Drama	Drama	East Macedonia and Thrace	
Aris Filiates	Άρης Φιλιατών	Filiates	Thesprotia	Epirus	
Aris Kalamaki	Άρης Καλαμακίου	Kalamaki	South Athens	Attica	
Aris Lofi	Άρης Λόφων	Lofoi	Florina	West Macedonia	
Aris Moudros	Άρης Μούδρου	Moudros	Lemnos	North Aegean	
Aris Palaiochori	Άρης Παλαιοχωρίου	Palaiochori	Chalkidiki	Central Macedonia	
Aris Panteleimon	Άρης Παντελεήμονα	Panteleimon	Kilkis	Central Macedonia	
Aris Patras	Άρης Πατρών	Patras	Achaea	West Greece	
Aris Piraeus	Άρης Πειραιώς	Piraeus	Piraeus	Attica	
Aris Protis	Άρης Πρώτης	Proti	Serres	Central Macedonia	
Aris Rethymno	Άρης Ρεθύμνου	Rethymno	Rethymno	Crete	
Aris Skala	Άρης Σκάλας	Skala	Laconia	Peloponnese	
Aris Souda	Άρης Σούδας	Souda	Chania	Crete	
Aris Vochaiko	Άρης Βοχαϊκού	Vochaiko	Corinthia	Peloponnese	
Aris Voula	Άρης Βούλας	Voula	East Attica	Attica	
AS Agion Theodoron	Α.Σ. Αγίων Θεοδώρων	Agioi Theodoroi	Corinthia	Peloponnese	
AS Drapetsonas	Α.Σ. Δραπετσώνας	Drapetsona	Piraeus	Attica	
AS Giannitsa	Α.Σ. Γιαννιτσών	Giannitsa	Pella	Central Macedonia	
AS Kofon	Α.Σ. Κωφών	Korydallos	Piraeus	Attica	
AS Lefkadion	Α.Σ. Λευκαδίων	Lefkadia	Imathia	Central Macedonia	
AS Papagou	Α.Σ. Παπάγου	Papagou	North Athens	Attica	
AS Pyrgetos	Α.Σ. Πυργετός	Pyrgetos	Larissa	Thessaly	
AS Velvento	Βελβεντό	Velvento	Kozani	West Macedonia	
Asites	Ασίτες	A. & K. Asites	Heraklion	Crete	
Aspida Xanthi	Ασπίς Ξάνθης	Xanthi	Xanthi	East Macedonia and Thrace	
Aspra Spitia - Antikyra Enosis	Ένωση Άσπρα Σπίτια - Αντίκυρα	P. Distomou & Antikyra	Boeotia	Central Greece	
Aspropyrgos	Ένωση Πανασπροπυργιακού-Δόξας	Aspropyrgos	West Attica	Attica	
Asteras Amaliadas	Αστέρας Αμαλιάδας	Amaliada	Elis	West Greece	
Asteras Ano Liosia	Αστέρας Νέων Λιοσίων	Ano Liosia	West Athens	Attica	
Asteras Arfara	Αστέρας Αρφαρών	Arfara	Messenia	Peloponnese	
Asteras Chaidari	Αστέρας Χαϊδαρίου	Chaidari	West Athens	Attica	
Asteras Derveni	Αστέρας Δερβενίου	Derveni	Corinthia	Peloponnese	
Asteras Drepaniakos	Αστέρας Δρεπανιακός	Drepano	Argolis	Peloponnese	
Asteras Exarcheia	Αστέρας Εξαρχείων	Exarcheia	Central Athens	Attica	
Asteras Glyfada	Αστέρας Γλυφάδας	Glyfada	South Athens	Attica	
Asteras Ippios	Αστέρας Ιππείου	Ippios	Lesbos	North Aegean	Lesbos B Division
Asteras Itea	Αστέρας Ιτέας	Itea	Phocis	Central Greece	
Asteras Keratsini	Αστέρας Κερατσινίου	Keratsini	Piraeus	Attica	
Asteras Korinthos	Αστέρας Κορίνθου	Corinth	Corinthia	Peloponnese	
Asteras Machairado	Αστέρας Μαχαιράδου	Machairado	Zakynthos	Ionian Islands	
Asteras Magoula	Αστέρας Μαγούλας	Magoula	West Attica	Attica	
Asteras Nikaia	Αστέρας Νίκαιας	Nikaia	Piraeus	Attica	
Asteras Niki Mytilene	Αστέρας Νίκης Μυτιλήνης	Mytilene	Lesbos	North Aegean	Lesbos B Division
Asteras Parapotamos	Αστέρας Παραποτάμου	Parapotamos	Thesprotia	Epirus	
Asteras Syros	Αστέρας Σύρου	Ermoupoli	Syros	South Aegean	
Asteras Vlachioti	Αστέρας Βλαχιώτη	Vlachiotis	Laconia	Peloponnese	
Asteras Zografou	Αστέρας Ζωγράφου	Zografou	Central Athens	Attica	
Asteria Drapetsonas	Αστέρια Δραπετσώνας	Drapetsona	Piraeus	Attica	
Astrapi Mesopotamia	Αστραπή Μεσοποταμιάς	Mesopotamia	Kastoria	West Macedonia	
Astrapi Psarofai	Αστραπή Ψαροφαΐου	Psarofai	Achaea	West Greece	
Astrapi Romanou	Αστραπή Ρωμανού	Romanou	Lemnos	North Aegean	
Astrapi Vamvakofyto	Αστραπή Βαμβακόφυτου	Vamvakofyto	Serres	Central Macedonia	
Astypalaia Korydallos	Αστυπάλαια Κορυδαλλού	Korydallos	Piraeus	Attica	
Athinaikos	Αθηναϊκός	Vyronas	Central Athens	Attica	
Athinais	Αθηναΐς	Kypseli	Central Athens	Attica	
Athlitiki Enosi Geraka Panstavraikou	Αθλητική Ένωση Γέρακα Πανσταυραϊκού	Gerakas	East Attica	Attica	
Athlitikos Syllogos Roma Zevgolatiou	Αθλητικός Σύλλογος Ρομά Ζευγολατιού	Zevgolateio	Corinthia	Peloponnese	
Atlantis Anthousa	Ατλαντίς Ανθούσας	Anthousa	East Attica	Attica	
Atlas Kypseli	Άτλας Κυψέλης	Kypseli	Central Athens	Attica	
Atromitos Achaea	Ατρόμητος Αχαΐας	Patras	Achaea	West Greece	
Atromitos Agia Marina	Ατρόμητος Αγίας Μαρίνας	Agia Marina	Lesbos	North Aegean	
Atromitos Anemotia	Ατρόμητος Ανεμώτιας	Anemotia	Lesbos	North Aegean	Lesbos A Division
Atromitos Chalandri	Ατρόμητος Χαλανδρίου	Chalandri	North Athens	Attica	
Atromitos Chalkero	Ατρόμητος Χαλκερού	Kavala	Kavala	East Macedonia and Thrace	
Atromitos Chiliomodi	Ατρόμητος Χιλιομοδίου	Chiliomodi	Corinthia	Peloponnese	
Atromitos Eleusis	Ατρόμητος Ελευσίνας	Eleusis	West Attica	Attica	
Atromitos Keratsini	Ατρόμητος Κερατσινίου	Keratsini	Piraeus	Attica	
Atromitos Metamorfosis	Ατρόμητος Μεταμόρφωσης	Metamorfosi	North Athens	Attica	
Atromitos Palamas	Ατρόμητος Παλαμά	Palamas	Karditsa	Thessaly	
Atromitos Patras	Ατρόμητος Πατρών	Zarouchleika	Achaea	West Greece	
Atromitos Piraeus	Ατρόμητος Πειραιώς	Piraeus	Piraeus	Attica	
Atromitos Sagiada	Ατρόμητος Σαγιάδας	Sagiada	Thesprotia	Epirus	
Atromitos Varvasaina	Ατρόμητος Βαρβάσαινας	Varvasaina	Elis	West Greece	
Atsalenios	Ατσαλένιος	Heraklion	Heraklion	Crete	
Attalos Nea Filadelfeia	Άτταλος Νέας Φιλαδέλφειας	Nea Filadelfeia	Central Athens	Attica	
Attalos Nea Peramos	Άτταλος Νέας Περάμου	Nea Peramos	West Attica	Attica	
Attikos	Αττικός	Kolonos	Central Athens	Attica	
Avlonari	Αυλωνάρι	Avlonari	Euboea	Central Greece	
Chaidari	Χαϊδάρι	Chaidari	West Athens	Attica	
Chalkidonikos	Χαλκηδονικός	Nea Chalkidona	Central Athens	Attica	
Charavgiakos Ilioupoli	Χαραυγιακός Ηλιούπολης	Ilioupoli	South Athens	Attica	
Cholargos	Χολαργός	Cholargos	North Athens	Attica	
Chrysoupoli	Χρυσούπολη	Peristeri	West Athens	Attica	
Dafni Andravida	Δάφνη Ανδραβίδας	Andravida	Elis	West Greece	
Dafni Athens	Δάφνη Αθηνών	Rouf	Central Athens	Attica	
Dafni Erythres	Δάφνη Ερυθρών	Erythres	West Attica	Attica	
Dafni Examilia	Δάφνη Εξαμιλίων	Examilia	Corinthia	Peloponnese	
Dafni Palaio Faliro	Δάφνη Παλαιού Φαλήρου	Palaio Faliro	South Athens	Attica	
Dafni Patras	Δάφνη Πατρών	Zarouchleika	Achaea	West Greece	
Dafni Poulitsa	Δάφνη Πουλίτσας	Poulitsa	Corinthia	Peloponnese	
Dafni Tambouria	Δάφνη Ταμπουριών	Nikaia	Piraeus	Attica	
DAO Zofrias	Δ.Α.Ο. Ζωφριάς	Ano Liosia	West Athens	Attica	
Dasos Chaidari	Δάσος Χαϊδαρίου	Chaidari	West Athens	Attica	
Diagoras Agia Paraskevi	Διαγόρας Αγίας Παρασκευής	Agia Paraskevi	Lesbos	North Aegean	Lesbos B Division
Diagoras Egaleo	Διαγόρας Αιγάλεω	Egaleo	West Athens	Attica	
Diagoras Sardes	Διαγόρας Σαρδών	Sardes	Lemnos	North Aegean	
Diagoras Sevasti	Διαγόρας Σεβαστής	Sevasti	Pieria	Central Macedonia	absorbed by Filippos Alexandria
Diagoras Stefanovikeio	Διαγόρας Στεφανοβικείου	Stefanovikeio	Magnesia	Thessaly	
Diagoras Vrachnaiika	Διαγόρας Βραχνέικων	Vrachnaiika	Achaea	West Greece	
Diana Ilioupolis	Διάνα Ηλιούπολης	Ilioupoli	Central Athens	Attica	
Dias Dion	Δίας Δίου	Dion	Pieria	Central Macedonia	
Dias Korydallos	Δίας Κορυδαλλού	Korydallos	Piraeus	Attica	
Digenis Charia	Διγενής Χαριάς	Charia	Elis	West Greece	
Digenis Lakkoma	Διγενής Λακκώματος	Lakkoma	Chalkidiki	Central Macedonia	
Dimitra Efxeinoupoli	Δήμητρα Ευξεινούπολης	Efxeinoupoli	Magnesia	Thessaly	
Dorieus Rhodes	Δωριεύς Ρόδου	Rhodes	Rhodes	South Aegean	Dodekanisos C Division
Doxa Agia Anna	Δόξα Αγίας Άννας	Acharnes	East Attica	Attica	
Doxa Anixi	Δόξα Άνοιξης	Anixi	East Attica	Attica	
Doxa Cherso	Δόξα Χέρσου	Cherso	Kilkis	Central Macedonia	
Doxa Desfina	Δόξα Δεσφίνας	Desfina	Phocis	Central Greece	
Doxa Elaionas	Δόξα Ελαιώνα	Elaionas	Elis	West Greece	
Doxa Gratini	Δόξα Γρατινής	Gratini	Rhodope	East Macedonia and Thrace	
Doxa Kato Kamila	Δόξα Κάτω Καμήλας	Kato Kamila	Serres	Central Macedonia	
Doxa Koropi	Δόξα Κορωπίου	Koropi	East Attica	Attica	
Doxa Kranoula	Δόξα Κρανούλας	Kranoula	Ioannina	Epirus	
Doxa Mavrovouni	Δόξα Μαυροβουνίου	Mavrovouni	Pella	Central Macedonia	absorbed by Ethnikos Giannitsa
Doxa Megalopoli	Δόξα Μεγαλόπολης	Megalopoli	Arcadia	Peloponnese	
Doxa Nea Manolada	Δοξα Νέας Μανωλάδας	Nea Manolada	Elis	West Greece	
Doxa Neo Sidirochori	Δόξα Νέου Σιδηροχωρίου	Neo Sidirochori	Rhodope	East Macedonia and Thrace	
Doxa Paralia	Δόξα Παραλίας	Paralia	Achaea	West Greece	
Doxa Pentalofos	Δόξα Πεντάλοφου	Pentalofos	Thessaloniki	Central Macedonia	
Doxa Petroussa	Δόξα Πετρούσσας	Petroussa	Drama	East Macedonia and Thrace	
Doxa Piraeus	Δόξα Πειραιά	Piraeus	Piraeus	Attica	
Doxa Plagia - Trygonas	Δόξα Πλαγιάς - Τρύγωνα	Plagia	Lesbos	North Aegean	
Doxa Proskynites	Δόξα Προσκυνητών	Proskynites	Rhodope	East Macedonia and Thrace	
Doxa Theologos	Δόξα Θεολόγου	Theologos	Kavala	East Macedonia and Thrace	
Doxa Vaptistis	Δόξα Βαπτιστή	Vaptistis	Kilkis	Central Macedonia	
Doxa Vyronas	Δόξα Βύρωνα	Vyronas	Central Athens	Attica	
Doxa Vyronia	Δόξα Βυρώνειας	Vyroneia	Serres	Central Macedonia	
Drasi Ardameri	Δράση Αρδαμερίου	Ardameri	Thessaloniki	Central Macedonia	
Dynami Aspropyrgos	Δύναμη Ασπροπύργου	Aspropyrgos	West Attica	Attica	
Efivos Pamfila	Έφηβος Παμφίλων	Pamfila	Lesbos	North Aegean	
Efklidis Megara	Ευκλείδης Μεγάρων	Megara	West Attica	Attica	
Eidylliakos	Ειδυλλιακός	Vilia	West Attica	Attica	
Eirini Nees Kydonies	Ειρήνη Νέων Κυδωνιών	Nees Kydonies	Lesbos	North Aegean	inactive
Ellas Pontion	Ελλάς Ποντίων	Piraeus	Piraeus	Attica	
Ellas Velo	Ελλάς Βέλου	Velo	Corinthia	Peloponnese	
Elpida Agioi Anargyroi	Ελπίδα Αγίων Αναργύρων	Agioi Anargyroi	West Athens	Attica	
Elpida Tripoli	Ελπίδα Τρίπολης	Tripoli	Arcadia	Peloponnese	
Elpis Chortero	Ελπίς Χορτερού	Chortero	Serres	Central Macedonia	dissolved
Elpis Sapes	Ελπίς Σαπών	Sapes	Rhodope	East Macedonia and Thrace	
Elpis Skoutari	Ελπίς Σκουτάρεως	Skoutari	Serres	Central Macedonia	merged with Veria and formed Veria
Enosi Apollon Akratitos Renti	Ένωση Απόλλων Ακράτητος Ρέντη	Agios Ioannis Renti	Piraeus	Attica	
Enosi Apostolou Pavlou	Ένωση Αποστόλου Παύλου	Apostolos Pavlos	Imathia	Central Macedonia	
Enosi Kaminion	Ένωση Καμινίων	Piraeus	Piraeus	Attica	
Enosi Lernas	Ένωση Λέρνας	Lerna	Argolis	Peloponnese	
Enosi Thrakis	Ένωση Θράκης	Alexandroupoli	Evros	East Macedonia and Thrace	dissolved
Eordaikos	Εορδαϊκός	Ptolemaida	Kozani	West Macedonia	
Erani Filiatra	Εράνη Φιλιατρών	Filiatra	Messenia	Peloponnese	
Ergotelis	Εργοτέλης	Heraklion	Heraklion	Crete	
Ermis Amyntaio	Ερμής Αμυνταίου	Amyntaio	Florina	West Macedonia	
Ermis Ano Liosia	Ερμής Άνω Λιοσίων	Ano Liosia	West Athens	Attica	
Ermis Irakleio	Ερμής Ηρακλείου	Irakleio	North Athens	Attica	
Ermis Kiveri	Ερμής Κιβερίου	Kiveri	Argolis	Peloponnese	
Ermis Korydallos	Ερμής Κορυδαλλού	Korydallos	Piraeus	Attica	
Ermis Meligou	Ερμής Μελιγούς	Meligou	Arcadia	Peloponnese	
Ermis Pamfila	Ερμής Παμφίλων	Pamfila	Lesbos	North Aegean	inactive
Ermis Platanos	Ερμής Πλατάνου	Platanos	Elis	West Greece	
Ermis Pyrgos	Ερμής Πύργου	Pyrgos	Elis	West Greece	
Ermis Zoniana	Ερμής Ζωνιανών	Zoniana	Rethymno	Crete	
Ethnikos Alexandroupoli	Εθνικός Αλεξανδρούπολης	Alexandroupoli	Evros	East Macedonia and Thrace	
Ethnikos Ampelokampos	Εθνικός Αμπελοκάμπου	Ampelokampos	Elis	West Greece	
Ethnikos Asteras	Εθνικός Αστέρας	Kaisariani	Central Athens	Attica	
Ethnikos Filippiada	Εθνικός Φιλιππιάδας	Filippiada	Preveza	Epirus	
Ethnikos Geraki	Εθνικός Γερακίου	Geraki	Elis	West Greece	
Ethnikos Giannitsa	Εθνικός Γιαννιτσών	Giannitsa	Pella	Central Macedonia	
Ethnikos Katerini	Εθνικός Κατερίνης	Katerini	Pieria	West Macedonia	
Ethnikos Lykias	Εθνικός Λυκίας	Nea Makri	East Attica	Attica	
Ethnikos Malgara	Εθνικός Μαλγάρων	Nea Malgara	Thessaloniki	Central Macedonia	
Ethnikos Meligalas	Εθνικός Μελιγαλά	Meligalas	Messenia	Peloponnese	
Ethnikos Neo Agioneri	Εθνικός Νέου Αγιονερίου	Neo Agioneri	Kilkis	Central Macedonia	
Ethnikos Panorama	Εθνικός Πανοράματος	Ano Liosia	West Athens	Attica	
Ethnikos Sageika	Εθνικός Σαγέικων	Sageika	Achaea	West Greece	
Ethnikos Sidirokastro	Εθνικός Σιδηροκάστρου	Sidirokastro	Serres	Central Macedonia	
Ethnikos Skoulikado	Εθνικός Σκουληκάδου	Skoulikado	Zakynthos	Ionian Islands	
Ethnikos Sochos	Εθνικός Σοχού	Sochos	Thessaloniki	Central Macedonia	
Ethnikos Thermi	Εθνικός Θερμής	Loutropoli Thermis	Lesbos	North Aegean	merged with Ermis Pamfila
Ethnikos Vatero	Εθνικός Βατερού	Vatero	Kozani	West Macedonia	
Ethnikos Vatikon	Εθνικός Βατίκων	Neapoli Voion	Laconia	Peloponnese	
Ethnikos Xylokeriza	Εθνικός Ξυλοκέριζας	Xylokeriza	Corinthia	Peloponnese	
Ethnikos Zacharo	Εθνικός Ζαχάρως	Zacharo	Elis	West Greece	
Evoikos Agios Nikolaos	Ευβοϊκός Αγίου Νικολάου	Agios Nikolaos	Euboea	Central Greece	
Evros Soufli	Έβρος Σουφλίου	Soufli	Evros	East Macedonia and Thrace	
Evrotas Elos	Ευρώτας Έλους	Elos	Laconia	Peloponnese	
Falaisia	Φαλαισία	Falaisia	Arcadia	Peloponnese	
Falanniakos	Φαλανιακός	Falanni	Larissa	Thessaly	
Falirikos	Φαληρικός	Nikaia	Piraeus	Attica	
FC Serres	Π.Σ. Σέρρες	Serres	Serres	Central Macedonia	
Filathli	Φίλαθλοι	Drapetsona	Piraeus	Attica	
Filia	Φίλια	Filia	Lesbos	North Aegean	Lesbos A Division
Filippos Alexandria	Φίλιππος Αλεξάνδρειας	Alexandria	Imathia	Central Macedonia	
Filoktitis Kontias	Φιλοκτήτης Κοντιά	Kontias	Lemnos	North Aegean	
Filyriakos	Φιλυριακός	Florina	Florina	West Macedonia	
Flamouli	Φλαμούλι	Flamouli	Trikala	Thessaly	
Foinikas Agia Sofia	Φοίνικας Αγίας Σοφίας	Piraeus	Piraeus	Attica	
Foinikas Kallithea	Φοίνικας Καλλιθέας	Kallithea	South Athens	Attica	
Foinikas Patras	Φοίνικας Πατρών	Patras	Achaea	West Greece	
Foinikas Peristeri	Φοίνικας Περιστερίου	Peristeri	West Athens	Attica	
Foinikas Polichni	Φοίνικας Πολίχνης	Polichni	Thessaloniki	Central Macedonia	
Foivos Kremasti	Φοίβος Κρεμαστής	Kremasti	Rhodes	South Aegean	Dodekanisos A Division
Foivos Vari	Φοίβος Βάρης	Vari	East Attica	Attica	
Fokikos	Φωκικός	Amfissa	Phocis	Central Greece	
Fostiras Ilioupolis	Φωστήρας Ηλιούπολης	Ilioupoli	Central Athens	Attica	
Fostiras Kaisariani	Φωστήρας Καισαριανής	Kaisariani	Central Athens	Attica	
Fostiras Ovrya	Φωστήρας Οβρυάς	Ovrya	Achaea	West Greece	
Galaxias	Γαλαξίας	Peristeri	West Athens	Attica	
GAPO Tarsina 97	Γ.Α.Π.Ο. Ταρσινά 97	Tarsina	Corinthia	Peloponnese	
Germanos Karavaggelis	Γερμανός Καραβαγγέλης	Stypsi	Lesbos	North Aegean	Lesbos B Division
Giannis Pathiakakis	Γιάννης Παθιακάκης	Dionysos	East Attica	Attica	
Giannitsa	Γιαννιτσά	Giannitsa	Pella	Central Macedonia	merged with Anagennisi Giannitsa
Grevena Aerata	Γρεβενά Αεράτα	Grevena	Grevena	West Macedonia	
GS Almyrou	Γ.Σ. Αλμυρού	Almyros	Magnesia	Thessaly	
GS Amarousiou	Γ.Σ. Αμαρουσίου	Marousi	North Athens	Attica	
GS Argyroupolis	Γ.Σ. Αργυρούπολης	Argyroupoli	South Athens	Attica	
GS Kaisarianis	Γ.Σ. Καισαριανής	Kaisariani	Central Athens	Attica	
Gyziakos	Γκυζιακός	Gyzi	Central Athens	Attica	
Iason Ilio	Ιάσων Ιλίου	Ilio	West Athens	Attica	
Ifaistia Kontopouli	Ηφαιστία Κοντοπουλίου	Kontopouli	Lemnos	North Aegean	
Ifaistos	Ήφαιστος	Agios Ioannis Renti	Piraeus	Attica	
Ifaistos Peristeri	Ήφαιστος Περιστερίου	Peristeri	West Athens	Attica	
Ifaistos Vrontamas	Ήφαιστος Βρονταμά	Vrontamas	Laconia	Peloponnese	
Ifitos Kalyvia	Ίφιτος Καλυβιών	Kalyvia	Elis	West Greece	
Ilisia 2004	Ιλίσια 2004	Zografou	Central Athens	Attica	
Ilisiakos	Ηλυσιακός	Zografou	Central Athens	Attica	
ILTEX Lykoi	ΗΛΤΕΞ Λύκοι	Kalochori	Thessaloniki	Central Macedonia	merged with Anagennisi Epanomi
Ikaros Neoktiston	Ίκαρος Νεοκτίστων	Aspropyrgos	West Attica	Attica	
Ikaros Kallithea	Ίκαρος Καλλιθέας	Kallithea	South Athens	Attica	
Iliakos Lechaina	Ηλειακός Λεχαινών	Lechaina	Elis	West Greece	
Iliakos Vartholomio	Ηλειακός Βαρθολομιού	Vartholomio	Elis	West Greece	
Iones Palaio Faliro	Ίωνες Παλαιού Φαλήρου	Palaio Faliro	South Athens	Attica	
Ionia Chania	Ιωνία Χανίων	Chania	Chania	Crete	
Ionikos Ionia	Ιωνικός Ιωνίας	Diavata	Thessaloniki	Central Macedonia	
Ippokratis	Ιπποκράτης	Peristeri	West Athens	Attica	
Ippokratis Souroti	Ιπποκράτης Σουρωτής	Souroti	Thessaloniki	Central Macedonia	
Iraklis Ammoudia	Ηρακλής Αμμουδιάς	Ammoudia	Serres	Central Macedonia	
Iraklis Ampelokipi	Ηρακλής Αμπελοκήπων	Ampelokipi	Thessaloniki	Central Macedonia	
Iraklis Atsiki	Ηρακλής Ατσικής	Atsiki	Lemnos	North Aegean	
Iraklis Eleusis	Ηρακλής Ελευσίνας	Eleusis	West Attica	Attica	
Iraklis Lechaio	Ηρακλής Λεχαίου	Lechaio	Corinthia	Peloponnese	
Iraklis Nikaia	Ηρακλής Νίκαιας	Nikaia	Piraeus	Attica	
Iraklis Patras	Ηρακλής Πατρών	Vlatero	Achaea	West Greece	
Iraklis Peristeri	Ηρακλής Περιστερίου	Peristeri	West Athens	Attica	
Iraklis Psachna	Ηρακλής Ψαχνών	Psachna	Euboea	Central Greece	
Iraklis Vervena	Ηρακλής Βερβένων	Vervena	Arcadia	Peloponnese	
Iraklis Volos	Ηρακλής Βόλου	Volos	Magnesia	Thessaly	
Iraklis Xylokastro	Ηρακλής Ξυλοκάστρου	Xylokastro	Corinthia	Peloponnese	
Iraklis Zygos	Ηρακλής Ζυγού	Neos Zygos	Xanthi	East Macedonia and Thrace	
Isaias Desfina	Ησαΐας Δεσφίνας	Desfina	Phocis	Central Greece	
Issaikos Skalochori	Ισσαϊκός Σκαλοχωρίου	Skalochori	Lesbos	North Aegean	inactive
Isthmiakos	Ισθμιακός	Isthmia	Corinthia	Peloponnese	
Istiaia-Apollonios Enosis	Ένωση Απολλωνίου - Ιστιαίας	Istiaia	Euboea	Central Greece	
Kamvouniakos Deskati	Καμβουνιακός Δεσκάτης	Deskati	Grevena	West Macedonia	
Kanaris Nenita	Κανάρης Νενήτων	Nenita	Chios	North Aegean	
Karaiskakis	Καραϊσκάκης	Arta	Arta	Epirus	
Kassandra	Κασσάνδρα	Kassandra	Chalkidiki	Central Macedonia	merged with Olympiacos Volos
Kastor	Κάστωρ	Kastoria	Kastoria	West Macedonia	
Kastro Geraki	Κάστρο Γερακίου	Geraki	Laconia	Peloponnese	
Kastro Monemvasias	Κάστρο Μονεμβασιάς	Monemvasia	Laconia	Peloponnese	
Kentavros Sosti	Κένταυρος Σωστίου	Sosti	Elis	West Greece	
Kentavros Vrilissia	Κένταυρος Βριλησσίων	Vrilissia	North Athens	Attica	
Kerameikos	Κεραμεικός	Kerameikos	Central Athens	Attica	
Keravnos Afalonas	Κεραυνός Αφάλωνα	Afalonas	Lesbos	North Aegean	Lesbos A Division
Keravnos Agios Dimitrios	Κεραυνός Αγίου Δημητρίου	Agios Dimitrios	Lemnos	North Aegean	
Keravnos Cheimadio	Κεραυνός Χειμαδιού	Cheimadio	Elis	West Greece	
Keravnos Glyfada	Κεραυνός Γλυφάδας	Glyfada	South Athens	Attica	
Keravnos Keratea	Κεραυνός Κερατέας	Keratea	East Attica	Attica	
Keravnos Kolchiko	Κεραυνός Κολχικού	Kolchiko	Thessaloniki	Central Macedonia	
Keravnos Perni	Κεραυνός Πέρνης	Perni	Kavala	East Macedonia and Thrace	
Keravnos Petroupoli	Κεραυνός Πετρούπολης	Petroupoli	West Athens	Attica	
Keravnos Thesprotiko	Κεραυνός Θεσπρωτικού	Thesprotiko	Preveza	Epirus	
Keravnos Vrina	Κεραυνός Βρίνας	Vrina	Elis	West Greece	
Kifissia 2010	Κηφισιά 2010	Kifissia	North Athens	Attica	
Kilkisiakos	Κιλκισιακός	Kilkis	Kilkis	Central Macedonia	
Kipoupoli	Κηπούπολη	Peristeri	West Athens	Attica	
Kissamikos	Κισσαμικός	Kissamos	Chania	Crete	merged with AO Chania and formed Chania
Kithairon Kaparelli	Κιθαιρών Καπαρελλίου	Kaparelli	Boeotia	Central Greece	
Kolonos	Κολωνός	Kolonos	Central Athens	Attica	
Kopsachila	Κοψαχείλα	Palaio Faliro	South Athens	Attica	
Korinthos 2006	Κόρινθος 2006	Corinth	Corinthia	Peloponnese	
Kornos	Κορνός	Kornos	Lemnos	North Aegean	
Koronida	Κορωνίδα	Galatsi	Central Athens	Attica	
Koronis Kilada	Κορωνίς Κοιλάδας	Kilada	Argolis	Peloponnese	
Koropi	Κορωπί	Koropi	East Attica	Attica	
Krios Aspropyrgos	Κριός Ασπρόπυργου	Aspropyrgos	West Attica	Attica	
Kronos Agios Dimitrios	Κρόνος Αγίου Δημητρίου	Agios Dimitrios	Laconia	Peloponnese	
Kronos Argyrades	Κρόνος Αργυράδων	Argyrades	Corfu	Ionian Islands	
Kronos Athens	Κρόνος Αθηνών	Kypseli	Central Athens	Attica	
Ktinotrofikos Asteras Kalirachi	Κτηνοτροφικός Αστέρας Καληράχης	Kalirachi	Grevena	West Macedonia	
Kyanos Asteras Vari	Κυανούς Αστήρ Βάρης	Vari	East Attica	Attica	
Kypros Korydallos	Κύπρος Κορυδαλλού	Korydallos	Piraeus	Attica	
Kypselos Korinthos	Κύψελος Κορίνθου	Corinth	Corinthia	Peloponnese	
Lailapas Chios	Λαίλαπας Χίου	Chios	Chios	North Aegean	
Lamberi Eleusis	Λαμπερή Ελευσίνας	Eleusis	West Attica	Attica	
Larisakos Agios Pavlos	Λαρισαϊκός Αγίου Παύλου	Agios Pavlos	Central Athens	Attica	
Lavra Argyroupolis	Λαύρα Αργυρούπολης	Argyroupoli	South Athens	Attica	
Lavreotiki	Λαυρεωτική	Laurium	East Attica	Attica	
Lefkos Astir Skourochori	Λευκός Αστήρ Σκουροχωρίου	Skourochori	Elis	West Greece	
Leon	Λέων	Ano Liosia	West Athens	Attica	
Leonidas Sparta	Λεωνίδας Σπάρτης	Sparta	Laconia	Peloponnese	
Leonidio	Λεωνίδιο	Leonidio	Arcadia	Peloponnese	
Leontari	Λεοντάρι	Leontari	Karditsa	Thessaly	
Leontes	Λέοντες	Rouf	Central Athens	Attica	
Leontes Amaliada	Λέοντες Αμαλιάδας	Amaliada	Elis	West Greece	
Leontes Kaminia	Λέοντες Καμινίων	Piraeus	Piraeus	Attica	
Levante	Λεβάντε	Zakynthos	Zakynthos	Ionian Islands	
Lilas Vasiliko	Λήλας Βασιλικού	Vasiliko	Euboea	Central Greece	
Liontarakia	Λιονταράκια	Mytilene	Lesbos	North Aegean	inactive
Loukisia	Λουκίσια	Loukisia	Euboea	Central Greece	
Lyki Chaidariou	Λύκοι Χαϊδαρίου	Chaidari	West Athens	Attica	
Machi Marathonas	Μάχη Μαραθώνα	Marathon	East Attica	Attica	
Machitis Terpsithea	Μαχητής Τερψιθέας	Terpsithea	Larissa	Thessaly	
Makareas Agra	Μακαρέας Άγρας	Agra	Lesbos	North Aegean	inactive
Makedonikos Siatista	Μακεδονικός Σιάτιστας	Siatista	Kozani	West Macedonia	
Mandraikos	Μανδραϊκός	Mandra	West Attica	Attica	
Mantiniakos	Μαντινειακός	Mantineia	Arcadia	Peloponnese	
Mavri Aeti Eleftherochori	Μαύροι Αετοί Ελευθεροχωρίου	Eleftherochori	Trikala	Thessaly	
Mavros Aetos	Μαύρος Αετός	Polydendri	East Attica	Attica	
Megarikos	Μεγαρικός	Megara	West Attica	Attica	
Megas Alexandros Ardassa	Μέγας Αλέξανδρος Άρδασσας	Ardassa	Kozani	West Macedonia	
Megas Alexandros Iasmos	Μέγας Αλέξανδρος Ιάσμου	Iasmos	Rhodope	East Macedonia and Thrace	
Megas Alexandros Irakleia	Μέγας Αλέξανδρος Ηράκλειας	Irakleia	Serres	Central Macedonia	dissolved
Megas Alexandros Kallithea	Μέγας Αλέξανδρος Καλλιθέας	Kastoria	Kastoria	West Macedonia	
Megas Alexandros Karperi	Μέγας Αλέξανδρος Καρπερής	Karperi	Serres	Central Macedonia	
Megas Alexandros Nea Zichni	Μέγας Αλέξανδρος Νέας Ζίχνης	Nea Zichni	Serres	Central Macedonia	
Megas Alexandros Thessaloniki	Μέγας Αλέξανδρος Θεσσαλονίκης	Thessaloniki	Thessaloniki	Central Macedonia	
Megas Alexandros Trikala	Μέγας Αλέξανδρος Τρικάλων	Trikala	Imathia	Central Macedonia	
Megas Alexandros Vafiochori	Μέγας Αλέξανδρος Βαφειοχωρίου	Vafiochori	Kilkis	Central Macedonia	
Megas Alexandros Xiropotamos	Μέγας Αλέξανδρος Ξηροποτάμου	Xiropotamos	Drama	East Macedonia and Thrace	
Melissia	Μελίσσια	Melissia	North Athens	Attica	
Meliteas Meliti	Μελιτέας Μελίτης	Meliti	Florina	West Macedonia	
Messiniakos	Μεσσηνιακός	Kalamata	Messenia	Peloponnese	
Meteora	Μετέωρα	Kalampaka	Trikala	Thessaly	
Mikrasiatiki Chios	Μικρασιατική Χίου	Chios	Chios	North Aegean	
Mikrasiatikos	Μικρασιατικός	Kaisariani	Central Athens	Attica	
Miltiadis Pyrgos Trifyllia	Μιλτιάδης Πύργου Τριφυλλίας	Trifylia	Messenia	Peloponnese	
Minotavros Mournies	Μινώταυρος Μουρνιών	Mournies	Chania	Crete	
Molaikos	Μολαϊκός	Molaoi	Laconia	Peloponnese	
Myrsinaikos Myrsini	Μυρσιναϊκός Μυρσίνης	Myrsini	Elis	West Greece	
Naoussa	Νάουσα	Naousa	Imathia	Central Macedonia	
Nea Peramos	Νέα Πέραμος	Nea Peramos	West Attica	Attica	
Nei Drapetsona	Νέοι Δραπετσώνας	Drapetsona	Piraeus	Attica	
Nei Evgenias	Νέοι Ευγένειας	Keratsini	Piraeus	Attica	
Nei Stimangas	Νέοι Στιμάγκας	Stimanga	Corinthia	Peloponnese	
Neo Ikonio	Νέο Ικόνιο	Perama	Piraeus	Attica	
Neopentelikos	Νεοπεντελικός	Nea Penteli	North Athens	Attica	
Neos Amfilochos	Νέος Αμφίλοχος	Amfilochia	Aetolia-Acarnania	West Greece	
Neos Aris Strefi	Νέος Άρης Στρεφίου	Strefi	Elis	West Greece	
Neos Asteras Rethymno	Νέος Αστέρας Ρεθύμνου	Rethymno	Rethymno	Crete	
Neos Atromitos Lasteika	Νέος Ατρόμητος Λασταίικων	Lasteika	Elis	West Greece	
Neos PO Neas Kallikrateias	Νέος Π.Ο. Νέας Καλλικράτειας	Kallikrateia	Chalkidiki	Central Macedonia	
Niki Agathia	Νίκη Αγκαθιάς	Agathia	Imathia	Central Macedonia	
Niki Alimos	Νίκη Αλίμου	Alimos	South Athens	Attica	
Niki Axos	Νίκη Αξού	Axos	Pella	Central Macedonia	
Niki Drosia	Νίκη Δροσιάς	Drosia	East Attica	Attica	
Niki Renti	Νίκη Ρέντη	Agios Ioannis Renti	Piraeus	Attica	
Niki Tragano	Νίκη Τραγανού	Tragano	Elis	West Greece	
Nikiforos	Νικηφόρος	Gerakas	East Attica	Attica	
Nikitaras Doliana	Νικηταράς Δολιανών	Doliana	Arcadia	Peloponnese	
Nikites Anthousa	Νικητές Ανθούσας	Anthousa	East Attica	Attica	
Nikolakakis Acharnes	Νικολακάκης Αχαρνών	Acharnes	East Attica	Attica	
Odigitria	Οδηγήτρια	Piraeus	Piraeus	Attica	
Odysseas Anagennisi	Οδυσσέας Αναγέννησης	Anagennisi	Serres	Central Macedonia	
Odysseas Elytis	Οδυσσέας Ελύτης	Mytilene	Lesbos	North Aegean	Lesbos A Division
Odysseas Kordelio	Οδυσσέας Κορδελιού	Kordelio	Thessaloniki	Central Macedonia	
Odysseas Nydri	Οδυσσέας Νυδρίου	Nydri	Lefkada	Ionian Islands	
OF Agiou Matthaiou	Ο.Φ. Αγίου Ματθαίου	Agios Matthaios	Corfu	Ionian Islands	
Oikonomos Tsaritsani	Οικονόμος Τσαριτσάνης	Tsaritsani	Larissa	Thessaly	
Oleniakos Oleni	Ωλενιακός Ωλένης	Oleni	Elis	West Greece	
Olympiacos Agios Stefanos	Ολυμπιακός Αγίου Στεφάνου	Agios Stefanos	East Attica	Attica	
Olympiacos Aigio	Ολυμπιακός Αιγίου	Aigio	Achaea	West Greece	dissolved
Olympiacos Assos	Ολυμπιακός Άσσου	Assos	Corinthia	Peloponnese	
Olympiacos Chalcis	Ολυμπιακός Χαλκίδας	Chalcis	Euboea	Central Greece	
Olympiacos Chersonissos	Ολυμπιακός Χερσονήσου	Chersonissos	Heraklion	Crete	
Olympiacos Gythio	Ολυμπιακός Γυθείου	Gytheio	Laconia	Peloponnese	
Olympiacos Kalamata	Ολυμπιακός Καλαμάτας	Kalamata	Messenia	Peloponnese	
Olympiacos Kamares	Ολυμπιακός Καμαρών	Kamares	Achaea	West Greece	
Olympiacos Kefalonia	Ολυμπιακός Κεφαλονιάς	Argostoli	Cephalonia	Ionian Islands	
Olympiacos Keratsini	Ολυμπιακός Κερατσινίου	Keratsini	Piraeus	Attica	
Olympiacos Kymina	Ολυμπιακός Κυμίνων	Kymina	Thessaloniki	Central Macedonia	
Olympiacos Laurium	Ολυμπιακός Λαυρίου	Laurium	East Attica	Attica	
Olympiacos Leonidio	Ολυμπιακός Λεωνιδίου	Leonidio	Arcadia	Peloponnese	
Olympiacos Loutraki	Ολυμπιακός Λουτρακίου	Loutraki	Corinthia	Peloponnese	
Olympiacos Nea Liosia	Ολυμπιακός Νέων Λιοσίων	Ilio	West Athens	Attica	
Olympiacos Perama	Ολυμπιακός Περάματος	Perama	Piraeus	Attica	
Olympiacos Rodopoli	Ολυμπιακός Ροδόπολης	Rodopoli	Serres	Central Macedonia	
Olympiacos Patras	Ολυμπιακός Πατρών	Patras	Achaea	West Greece	
Olympiacos Savalia	Ολυμπιακός Σαβαλίων	Savalia	Elis	West Greece	
Olympiacos Vari	Ολυμπιακός Βάρης	Vari	East Attica	Attica	
Olympiacos Zacharo	Ολυμπιακός Ζαχάρως	Zacharo	Elis	West Greece	
Olympiada Goumero	Ολυμπιάδα Γουμέρου	Goumero	Elis	West Greece	
Olympos Agiasos	Όλυμπος Αγιάσου	Agiasos	Lesbos	North Aegean	Lesbos A Division
Olympos Kerkyra	Όλυμπος Κέρκυρας	Corfu	Corfu	Ionian Islands	
Omonia Petras	Ομόνοια Πέτρας	Petra	Arta	Epirus	merged with Aetos Diasellou and AO Artas and formed Karaiskakis
Omonia Sindos	Ομόνοια Σίνδου	Sindos	Thessaloniki	Central Macedonia	
Opountios Martino	Οπούντιος Μαρτίνου	Martino	Phthiotis	Central Greece	
Orchomenos Levidi	Ορχομενός Λεβιδίου	Levidi	Arcadia	Peloponnese	
Orestis Orestiada	Ορέστης Ορεστιάδας	Orestiada	Evros	East Macedonia and Thrace	
Orfeas Antissa	Ορφέας Άντισσας	Antissa	Lesbos	North Aegean	Lesbos B Division
Orfeas Egaleo	Ορφέας Αιγάλεω	Egaleo	West Athens	Attica	
Orfeas Eleftheroupoli	Ορφέας Ελευθερούπολης	Eleftheroupoli	Kavala	East Macedonia and Thrace	
Orfeas Keramia	Ορφέας Κεραμειών	Kerameia	Lesbos	North Aegean	merged with Asteras Ippios
PAE Kerkyra	Α.Ο.Κ. Π.Α.Ε. Κέρκυρα	Corfu	Corfu	Ionian Islands	
Pallavreotikos	Παλλαυρεωτικός	Laurium	East Attica	Attica	
Pallesviakos	Παλλεσβιακός	Mytilene	Lesbos	North Aegean	
Palliniakos	Παλληνιακός	Pallini	East Attica	Attica	
Pallixouriakos	Παλληξουριακός	Lixouri	Cephalonia	Ionian Islands	
Pamfeneatikos	Παμφενεατικός	Feneos	Corinthia	Peloponnese	
Pamisos Messini	Πάμισος Μεσσήνης	Messene	Messenia	Peloponnese	
Pampaianikos	Παμπαιανικός	Paiania	East Attica	Attica	
Pampatraikos	Παμπατραϊκός	Patras	Achaea	West Greece	
Panakrotiriakos	Πανακρωτηριακός	Akrotiri	Chania	Crete	
Panamvrakikos Bouka	Παναμβρακικός Μπούκας	Amfilochia	Aetolia-Acarnania	West Greece	
Panargiakos Argos Orestiko	Παναργειακός Άργους Ορεστικού	Argos Orestiko	Kastoria	West Macedonia	
Panarkadikos	Παναρκαδικός	Tripoli	Arcadia	Peloponnese	
Panegialios	Παναιγιάλειος	Aigio	Achaea	West Greece	
Panerythraikos	Πανερυθραϊκός	Nea Erythraia	North Athens	Attica	
Panevrostiniakos	Πανευρωστινιακός	Rozena	Corinthia	Peloponnese	
Panfalirikos	Πανφαληρικός	Neo Faliro	Piraeus	Attica	
Panionios Achilleas Agyia	Πανιώνιος Αχιλλέας Αγυιάς	Agyia	Achaea	West Greece	
Panionios Argos	Πανιώνιος Άργους	Argos	Argolis	Peloponnese	
Panionios Kaisarianis	Πανιώνιος Καισαριανής	Kaisariani	Central Athens	Attica	
Panionios Keratsini	Πανιώνιος Κερατσινίου	Keratsini	Piraeus	Attica	
Panionios Megalopoli	Πανιώνιος Μεγαλόπολης	Megalopoli	Arcadia	Peloponnese	
Pankamariakos	Πανκαμαριακός	Xylokastro	Corinthia	Peloponnese	
Pankladiatikos	Πανκλαδιατικός	Kladas	Laconia	Peloponnese	
Panlefkadios	Πανλευκάδιος	Kalamitsi	Lefkada	Ionian Islands	
Panliosiakos	Πανλιοσιακός	Ano Liosia	West Athens	Attica	
Panmovriakos Riolou	Πανμοβριακός Ριόλου	Riolos	Achaea	West Greece	
Pannafpliakos 2017	Πανναυπλιακός 2017	Nafplion	Argolis	Peloponnese	
Pannaxiakos	Πανναξιακός	Naxos	Naxos	South Aegean	
Panneapolikos	Παννεαπολικός	Nikaia	Piraeus	Attica	
Pannemeatikos	Παννεμεατικός	Nemea	Corinthia	Peloponnese	
Panoleniakos Karatoula	Πανωλενιακός Καράτουλα	Karatoula	Elis	West Greece	
Pansolygiakos	Πανσολυγειακός	Sofiko	Corinthia	Peloponnese	
Panstavraikos AO Mesogion	Πανσταυραϊκός Α.Ο. Μεσογείων	Gerakas	East Attica	Attica	
Panthiraikos	Πανθηραϊκός	Thera	Santorini	South Aegean	
Panthiseiakos	Πανθησειακός	Thiseio	Central Athens	Attica	
Panthyreatikos	Πανθυρεατικός	Astros	Arcadia	Peloponnese	
Pantzitzifiakos Karpathos	Παντζιτζιφιακός Κάρπαθος	Tzitzifies	South Athens	Attica	
PAO Fylis	Π.Α.Ο. Φυλής	Fyli	West Attica	Attica	
PAO Kakovatou	Π.Α.Ο. Κακοβάτου	Kakovatos	Elis	West Greece	
PAO Kalyvion	Π.Α.Ο. Καλυβίων	Kalyvia Thorikou	East Attica	Attica	
PAO Kamaterou	Π.Α.Ο. Καματερού	Kamatero	West Athens	Attica	
PAO Kandilas	Π.Α.Ο. Κανδήλας	Kandila	Arcadia	Peloponnese	
PAO Koufalion	Π.Α.Ο. Κουφαλίων	Koufalia	Thessaloniki	Central Macedonia	
PAO Kountouron Mandras	Π.Α.Ο. Κουντούρων Μάνδρας	Mandra	West Attica	Attica	
PAO Krousona	Π.Α.Ο. Κρουσώνα	Krousonas	Heraklion	Crete	
PAO Vardas	Π.Α.Ο. Βάρδας	Varda	Elis	West Greece	
PAOK Alexandrias	Π.Α.Ο.Κ. Αλεξάνδρειας	Alexandria	Imathia	Central Macedonia	
PAOK Kos	Π.Α.Ο.Κ. Κω	Kos	Kos	South Aegean	
PAOK Kosmiou	Π.Α.Ο.Κ. Κοσμίου	Kosmio	Rhodope	East Macedonia and Thrace	
PAOK Tripolis	Π.Α.Ο.Κ. Τρίπολης	Tripoli	Arcadia	Peloponnese	
PAONE	Π.Α.Ο.Ν.Ε.	Neoi Epivates	Thessaloniki	Central Macedonia	dissolved
Papanikolis Eresos	Παπανικολής Ερεσού	Eresos	Lesbos	North Aegean	Lesbos B Division
Parnassos Arachova	Παρνασσός Αράχωβας	Arachova	Boeotia	Central Greece	
PAS Acheron Kanallakiou	Π.Α.Σ. Αχέρων Καναλακίου	Kanallaki	Preveza	Epirus	
PAS Agiou Georgiou	Π.Α.Σ. Αγίου Γεωργίου	Corinth	Corinthia	Peloponnese	
PAS Athinon 1966	Π.Α.Σ. Αθηνών 1966	Hellinikon	South Athens	Attica	
PAS Florina	Π.Α.Σ. Φλώρινα	Florina	Florina	West Macedonia	
PAS Galatsi	Π.Α.Σ. Γαλάτσι	Galatsi	Central Athens	Attica	
PAS Klenias	Π.Α.Σ. Κλένιας	Klenia	Corinthia	Peloponnese	
PAS Korinthos	Π.Α.Σ. Κόρινθος	Corinth	Corinthia	Peloponnese	
PAS Oropos	Π.Α.Σ. Ωρωπός	Oropos	East Attica	Attica	
PAS Palaio Faliro	Π.Α.Σ. Παλαιό Φάληρο	Palaio Faliro	South Athens	Attica	
PAS Preveza	Π.Α.Σ. Πρέβεζα	Preveza	Preveza	Epirus	
PAS Thyella 2015	Π.Α.Σ. Θύελλα 2015	Monastiraki	Aetolia-Acarnania	West Greece	
Patisia	Πατήσια	Patisia	Central Athens	Attica	
Patouchas	Πατούχας	Viannos	Heraklion	Crete	
Patreus	Πατρεύς	Patras	Achaea	West Greece	
Pefki	Πεύκη	Pefki	North Athens	Attica	
Pelopas Kiato	Πέλοψ Κιάτου	Kiato	Corinthia	Peloponnese	
Pelopas Pelopio	Πέλοψ Πελοπίου	Pelopio	Elis	West Greece	
Pelopas Pyrgos	Πέλοψ Πύργου	Pyrgos	Elis	West Greece	
Pentavrysos	Πεντάβρυσος	Pentavryso	Kastoria	West Macedonia	
Pera Club	Πέρα Κλουμπ	Ampelokipi	Central Athens	Attica	
Peramaikos	Περαμαϊκός	Perama	Piraeus	Attica	
Petralona	Πετράλωνα	Petralona	Central Athens	Attica	
Petrinaikos Smynous	Πετριναϊκός Σμύνους	Petrina	Laconia	Peloponnese	
PFO Panopoulou	Π.Φ.Ο. Πανόπουλου	Panopoulo	Elis	West Greece	merged with Asteras Amaliada
Pigasos Agios Dionysios	Πήγασος Αγίου Διονυσίου	Piraeus	Piraeus	Attica	
Pigasos Begoulaki	Πήγασος Μπεγουλακίου	Begoulaki	Achaea	West Greece	
Pindos Konitsa	Πίνδος Κόνιτσας	Konitsa	Ioannina	Epirus	
Piniakos Amaliada	Πηνειακός Αμαλιάδας	Amaliada	Elis	West Greece	
Piraikos	Πειραϊκός	Neo Faliro	Piraeus	Attica	
Piratis Laganas	Πειρατής Λαγανά	Laganas	Zakynthos	Ionian Islands	
Platon	Πλάτων	Akadimia Platonos	Central Athens	Attica	
PO Agiou Thoma	Π.Ο. Αγίου Θωμά	Goudi	Central Athens	Attica	
PO Moudanion	Π.Ο. Μουδανιών	Nea Moudania	Chalkidiki	Central Macedonia	
PO Psychikou	Π.Ο. Ψυχικού	Psychiko	North Athens	Attica	
PO Triglias	Π.Ο. Τρίγλιας	Triglia	Chalkidiki	Central Macedonia	absorbed by Iraklis 1908
Polykratis Piraeus	Πολυκράτης Πειραιώς	Piraeus	Piraeus	Attica	
Pontii Drapetsona	Πόντιοι Δραπετσώνας	Drapetsona	Piraeus	Attica	
Pontii Evmoiro	Πόντιοι Ευμοίρου	Mega Evmoiro	Xanthi	East Macedonia and Thrace	
Portaikos Pylis	Πορταϊκός Πύλης	Pyli	Trikala	Thessaly	
Portocheliakos	Πορτοχελιακός	Porto Cheli	Argolis	Peloponnese	
Posidon Chatzikyriakio	Ποσειδών Χατζηκυριάκειου	Piraeus	Piraeus	Attica	
Posidon Glyfada	Ποσειδών Γλυφάδας	Glyfada	South Athens	Attica	
Posidon Kalamaria	Ποσειδών Καλαμαριάς	Kalamaria	Thessaloniki	Central Macedonia	
Posidon Palaioi Poroi	Ποσειδών Παλαιών Πόρων	Poroi	Pieria	Central Macedonia	
Posidon Patras	Ποσειδών Πατρών	Patras	Achaea	West Greece	
Posidon Perama	Ποσειδών Περάματος	Perama	Lesbos	North Aegean	dissolved
Prasina Poulia	Πράσινα Πουλιά	Peristeri	West Athens	Attica	
Prasina Poulia Kalamata	Πράσινα Πουλιά Καλαμάτας	Kalamata	Messenia	Peloponnese	
Profitis Ilias Piraeus	Προφήτης Ηλίας Πειραιά	Piraeus	Piraeus	Attica	
Promitheas Athens	Προμηθέας Αθηνών	Ymittos	Central Athens	Attica	
Promitheas Pirea	Προμηθέας Πειραιά	Piraeus	Piraeus	Attica	
Proodeftiki Manolada	Προοδευτική Μανωλάδας	Manolada	Elis	West Greece	
Proodeftiki Perigiali	Προοδευτική Περιγιαλίου	Perigiali	Corinthia	Peloponnese	
Proodeftiki Skala Kalloni	Προοδευτική Σκάλας Καλλονής	Skala Kalloni	Lesbos	North Aegean	Lesbos A Division
Proodos Agios Vasilios	Πρόοδος Αγίου Βασιλείου	Agios Vasilios	Corinthia	Peloponnese	
Proodos Salmoni	Πρόοδος Σαλμώνης	Salmoni	Elis	West Greece	
Propontis Nea Koutali	Προποντίδα Νέας Κούταλης	Nea Koutali	Lemnos	North Aegean	
Propontis Chalcis	Προποντίδα Χαλκίδας	Chalcis	Euboea	Central Greece	
Prosotsani	Προσοτσάνη	Prosotsani	Drama	East Macedonia and Thrace	
Proteus Aperi	Πρωτέας Απερίου	Karpathos	Karpathos	South Aegean	
Proteus Palaia Fokaia	Πρωτέας Παλαιάς Φώκαιας	Palaia Fokaia	East Attica	Attica	
PS «I Sparti»	Π.Σ. "Η Σπάρτη"	Pellana	Laconia	Peloponnese	
Psiloritis	Ψηλορείτης	Amari	Rethymno	Crete	
Pydna Kitros	Πύδνα Κίτρους	Kitros	Pieria	Central Macedonia	absorbed by Volos
Pyrasos Nea Anchialos	Πύρασος Νέας Αγχιάλου	Nea Anchialos	Magnesia	Thessaly	
Pyrrichios Aspropyrgos	Πυρρίχιος Ασπρόπυργου	Aspropyrgos	West Attica	Attica	
Pyrsos Grevena	Πυρσός Γρεβενών	Grevena	Grevena	West Macedonia	
Pythagoras Kontakaiika	Πυθαγόρας Κοντακαίικων	Kontakaiika	Samos	North Aegean	
Pythagoras Perama	Πυθαγόρας Περάματος	Perama	Piraeus	Attica	
Rethymniakos	Ρεθυμνιακός	Rethymno	Rethymno	Crete	
Rigas Feraios	Ρήγας Φεραίος	Velestino	Magnesia	Thessaly	
Rouvas	Ρούβας	Gergeri	Heraklion	Crete	
Saframpoli	Σαφράμπολη	Nea Ionia	North Athens	Attica	
Salaminomachi	Σαλαμινομάχοι	Ampelakia	Islands	Attica	
Santorini 2020	Α.Σ. Σαντορίνης 2020	Thera	Santorini	South Aegean	
Saronikos Aegina	Σαρωνικός Αίγινας	Aegina	Islands	Attica	
Saronikos Anavyssos	Σαρωνικός Αναβύσσου	Anavyssos	East Attica	Attica	
Saronikos Galataki	Σαρωνικός Γαλατακίου	Galataki	Corinthia	Peloponnese	
SF PAOK Patriarcheio	Σ.Φ. Π.Α.Ο.Κ. Πατριαρχείο	Giannitsa	Pella	Central Macedonia	
Skorpios Fyli	Σκορπιός Φυλής	Fyli	West Attica	Attica	
Skoufas Kompoti	Σκουφάς Κομποτίου	Kompoti	Arta	Epirus	
Souli Paramythia	Σούλι Παραμυθιάς	Paramythia	Thesprotia	Epirus	
Sourmena	Σούρμενα	Hellinikon	South Athens	Attica	
Spitha Nikaia	Σπίθα Νίκαιας	Nikaia	Piraeus	Attica	
Tamynaikos	Ταμυναϊκός	Aliveri	Euboea	Central Greece	
Tatavla	Ταταύλα	Palaio Faliro	South Athens	Attica	
Taxiarches Niata	Ταξιάρχες Νιάτων	Niata	Laconia	Peloponnese	
Taxiarchis Mantamados	Ταξιάρχης Μανταμάδου	Mantamados	Lesbos	North Aegean	Lesbos B Division
Telos Agras Gargaliani	Τέλος Άγρας Γαργαλιάνων	Gargalianoi	Messenia	Peloponnese	
Teneatis Athikia	Τενεάτης Αθικιών	Athikia	Corinthia	Peloponnese	
Terpsithea	Τερψιθέα	Glyfada	South Athens	Attica	
Themistoklis	Θεμιστοκλής	Egaleo	West Athens	Attica	
Thermaikos Thessaloniki	Θερμαϊκός Θεσσαλονίκης	Thessaloniki	Thessaloniki	Central Macedonia	
Theseus Piraeus	Θησέας Πειραιώς	Piraeus	Piraeus	Attica	
Theseus Nea Makri	Θησέας Νέας Μάκρης	Nea Makri	East Attica	Attica	
Thinaliakos	Θιναλιακός	Acharavi	Corfu	Ionian Islands	
Thiseas Agrias	Θησέας Αγριάς	Agria	Magnesia	Thessaly	
Thrasyvoulos Fylis	Θρασύβουλος Φυλής	Fyli	West Attica	Attica	
Thriamvos Athens	Θρίαμβος Αθηνών	Ymittos	Central Athens	Attica	
Thriamvos Chaidari	Θρίαμβος Χαϊδαρίου	Chaidari	West Athens	Attica	
Thriamvos Louros	Θρίαμβος Λούρου	Louros	Preveza	Epirus	
Thriamvos Pyrgos	Θρίαμβος Πύργου	Pyrgos	Elis	West Greece	
Thriamvos Serviana	Θρίαμβος Σερβιανών	Serviana	Ioannina	Epirus	
Thyella Agios Dimitrios	Θύελλα Αγίου Δημητρίου	Agios Dimitrios	South Athens	Attica	
Thyella Aigio	Θύελλα Αιγίου	Aigio	Achaea	West Greece	
Thyella Ampelokipi	Θύελλα Αμπελοκήπων	Ampelokipi	Zakynthos	Ionian Islands	
Thyella Eleousa	Θύελλα Ελεούσας	Arta	Arta	Epirus	
Thyella Filotas	Θύελλα Φιλώτα	Filotas	Florina	West Macedonia	
Thyella Kamari	Θύελλα Καμαρίου	Kamari	Santorini	South Aegean	merged with Panthiraikos and formed Santorini 2020
Thyella Kardamas	Θύελλα Καρδαμά	Kardamas	Elis	West Greece	
Thyella Kato Diminio	Θύελλα Κάτω Διμηνίου	Kato Diminio	Corinthia	Peloponnese	
Thyella Katsikas	Θύελλα Κατσικά	Katsikas	Ioannina	Epirus	
Thyella Moschato	Θύελλα Μοσχάτου	Moschato	South Athens	Attica	
Thyella Patras	Θύελλα Πατρών	Patras	Achaea	West Greece	
Thyella Peristeri	Θύελλα Περιστερίου	Peristeri	West Athens	Attica	
Thyella Petriou	Θύελλα Πετρίου	Petri	Corinthia	Peloponnese	
Thyella Pigi	Θύελλα Πηγής	Pigi	Lesbos	North Aegean	inactive
Thyella Pyrgos	Θύελλα Πύργου	Katarachi	Elis	West Greece	
Thyella Sarakinoi	Θύελλα Σαρακηνών	Sarakinoi	Pella	Central Macedonia	absorbed by Keravnos Angelochori
Toxotis Volos	Τοξότης Βόλου	Nea Dimitriada	Magnesia	Thessaly	
Trifylliakos	Τριφυλλιακός	Melissia	North Athens	Attica	
Triglia Rafinas	Τριγλία Ραφήνας	Rafina	East Attica	Attica	
Trikala 1963	Τρίκαλα 1963	Trikala	Trikala	Thessaly	defunct
Trinasiakos	Τρινασιακός	Stefania	Laconia	Peloponnese	
Tritaiikos	Τριταιικός	Stavrodromi	Achaea	West Greece	
Triziniakos	Τροιζηνιακός	Troezen	Islands	Attica	
Tsiklitiras Pylos	Τσικλητήρας Πύλου	Pylos	Messenia	Peloponnese	
Tyrnavos 2005	Τύρναβος 2005	Tyrnavos	Larissa	Thessaly	
Varvasiakos Chios	Βαρβασιακός Χίου	Chios	Chios	North Aegean	
Vataniakos Katerini	Βατανιακός Κατερίνης	Katerini	Pieria	Central Macedonia	
Velissarios Ioannina	Βελισσάριος Ιωαννίνων	Velissarios	Ioannina	Epirus	
Vellerefon Archaias Korinthou	Βελλερεφών Αρχαίας Κορίνθου	Ancient Corinth	Corinthia	Peloponnese	
Veria	Βέροια	Veria	Imathia	Central Macedonia	merged with Elpis Skoutari and formed Veria
Vias Neapoli	Βοίας Νεάπολης	Neapoli Voion	Laconia	Peloponnese	
Visaltiakos Nigrita	Βισαλτιακός Νιγρίτας	Nigrita	Serres	Central Macedonia	
Volis Kato Garouna	Βολίς Κάτω Γαρούνας	Kato Garouna	Corfu	Ionian Islands	
Vrilissia	Βριλήσσια	Vrilissia	North Athens	Attica	
Vyron	Βύρων	Vyronas	Central Athens	Attica	
Vyron Moria	Βύρων Μόριας	Moria	Lesbos	North Aegean	inactive
Vyzantio Kokkinochoma	Βυζάντιο Κοκκινοχώματος	Kokkinochoma	Kavala	East Macedonia and Thrace	
Xanthi	Ξάνθη	Xanthi	Xanthi	East Macedonia and Thrace	
Xenofon Krestena	Ξενοφών Κρεστενών	Krestena	Elis	West Greece	
Ymittos	Υμηττός	Ymittos	Central Athens	Attica	
Kopansa	ΚΟΠΑΝΣΑ	Nea Smyrni	Athens	Greece	
Zavlani	Ζαβλάνι	Zavlani	Achaea	West Greece	
