= Korfos =

Korfos Κόρφος
- Community
- Location within Greece
- Coordinates: 37°45.9′N 23°7.5′E
- Country: Greece
- Administrative region: Peloponnese
- Regional unit: Corinthia
- Municipality: Corinth
- Municipal unit: Solygeia

Population (2021)
  - Community: 319
- Time zone: UTC+2 (EET)
  - Summer (DST): UTC+3 (EEST)
- Postal code: 20 004
- Area code: 27410
- Vehicle registration: ΚΡ
- Website: www.korfos-korinthias.gr

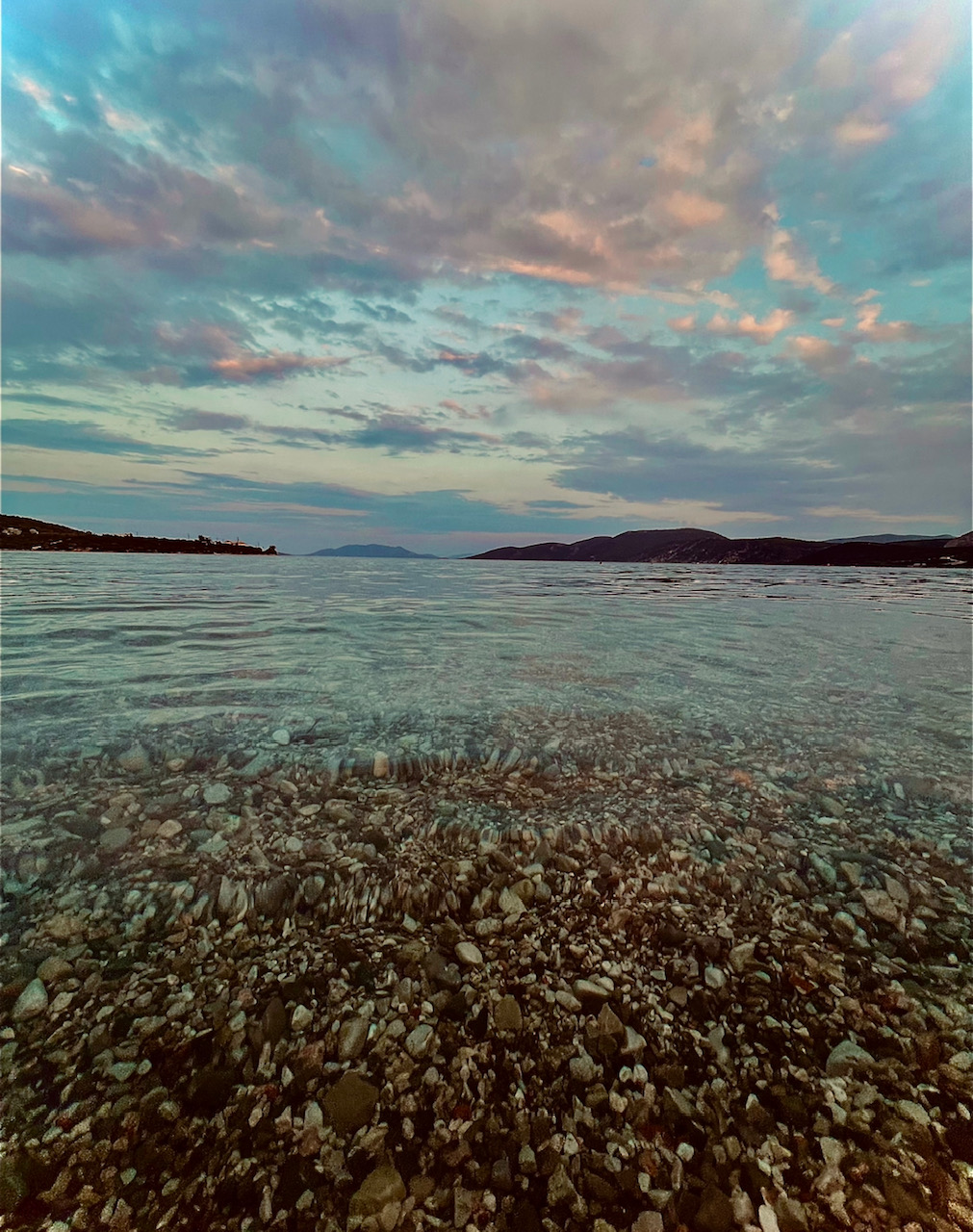
Korfus beach

Korfos (Greek: Κόρφος) is a small port town located on the coast of Sofiko Bay, in the southeastern part of Corinthia, Greece. It is part of the municipal unit of Solygeia.
