= Lechaio =

Lechaio Λέχαιο
- Community
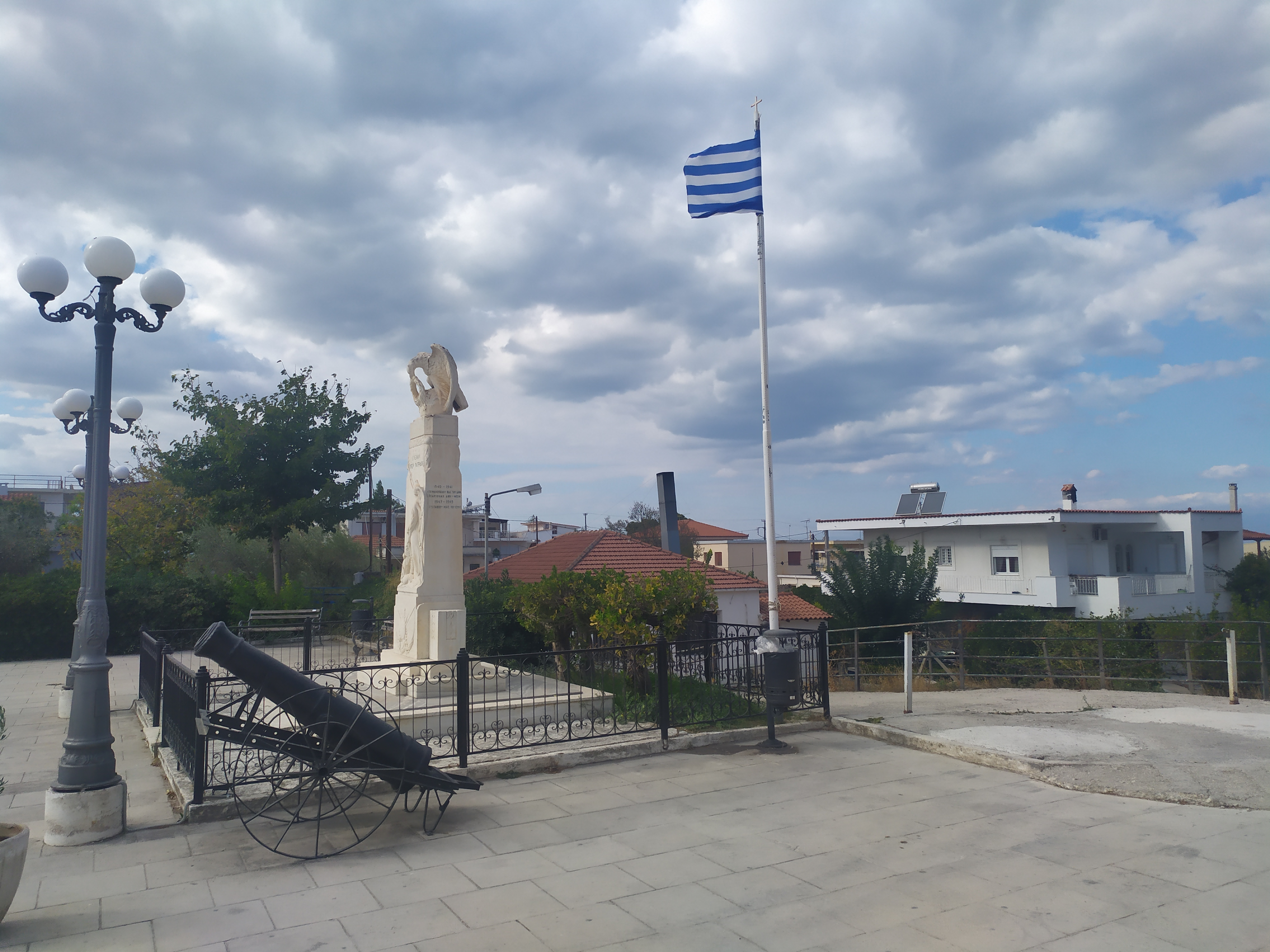

- Location within Greece
- Coordinates: 37°56′N 22°51′E
- Country: Greece
- Administrative region: Peloponnese
- Regional unit: Corinthia
- Municipality: Corinth
- Municipal unit: Assos-Lechaio

Population (2021)
  - Community: 2,672
- Time zone: UTC+2 (EET)
  - Summer (DST): UTC+3 (EEST)
- Postal code: 20 006
- Area code: 27410
- Vehicle registration: ΚΡ

Lechaio (Greek: Λέχαιο) is a village in the municipal unit of Assos-Lechaio in Corinthia, Greece. It is situated on the coast of the Gulf of Corinth, 8 km west of Corinth and 12 km southeast of Kiato. The Greek National Road 8 passes through the town. It had a railway station on the Piraeus–Patras railway, but passenger service on this line was halted in 2009.

== Historical population ==
Year	Population
1981	2,159
1991	2,319
2001	3,952
2011	2,643
2021	2,672

== History ==
Ancient Lechaeum was one of the ports of Ancient Corinth. It was connected to Corinth by a pair of strong walls. In the 390 BC Battle of Lechaeum, a Spartan mora (regiment) was defeated by the Athenians led by Iphicrates at Lechaeum.

The small airport was built by the Germans in the World War II to serve as a military air-base for the control of the south-eastern Mediterranean area. In tunnels under the airport, a large inventory of weapons and many barrels of oil were stored by the German army.

== See also ==
- List of settlements in Corinthia
