= Giorgos Vourgoutzis =

Greek footballer

Personal information
- Full name: Georgios Vourgoutzis
- Date of birth: 3 March 1991 (age 35)
- Place of birth: Mytilene, Greece
- Height: 1.70 m (5 ft 7 in)
- Position: Striker

Team information
- Current team: Aiolikos
- Number: 21

Senior career*
Years	Team	Apps	(Gls)
n/a–n/a	Pallesviakos	n/a (n/a)	
n/a–n/a	A.E.M.	n/a (n/a)	
2007–2008	Aiolikos	1 (–)	
- * Club domestic league appearances and goals

Giorgos Vourgoutzis (Greek: Γιώργος Βουργουντζής; born 3 March 1991) is a Greek football player who plays for Aiolikos. He played for the club during its last season in the Gamma Ethniki.

== See also ==
- Football in Greece
- List of football clubs in Greece
