= Saronikos =

Saronikos (Greek: Σαρωνικός) may refer to the following places in Greece:

- the Saronic Gulf (Saronikos Kolpos)
- Saronikos, Attica, a municipality in East Attica
- Saronikos, Corinthia, a municipal unit of Corinth
