= Elpis Skoutari F.C. =

Greek football club

Elpis Skoutari
- Founded: 1958; 2019 (re-establishment)
- Ground: Skoutari Ground
- League: Serres FCA Second Division
- 2025–26: Inactive
Home colours	Away colours

Elpis Skoutari F.C. is a Greek football club, based in Skoutari, Serres, Greece.

== Honors ==
=== Domestic Titles and honors ===
  - Serres FCA Cup Winners: 1
    - 2016–17
- Greek Football Amateur Cup
  - Runners-Up (1): 2016–17
