= Lechaeum =

Ancient port of Corinth, Greece

Coordinates: 37°55′58″N 22°53′17″E

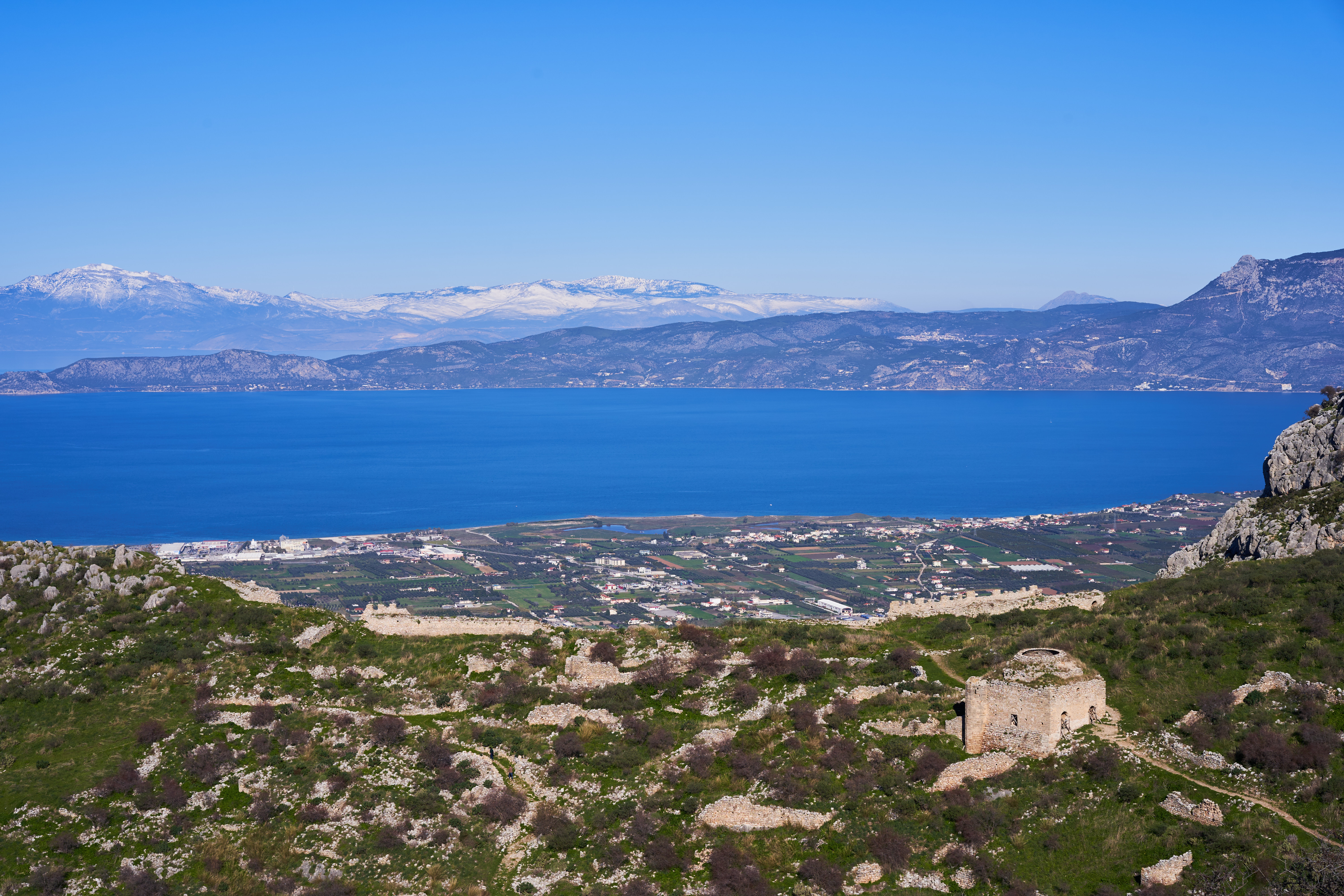
The Corinthian Gulf from Acrocorinth, Lechaeum in the centre

Lechaeum or Lechaion (Ancient Greek: τὸ Λεχαῖον), also called Lecheae and Lecheum, was the main port of Corinth on the Corinthian Gulf connected with the city by means of a road between the Long Walls, 2.3 km in length. Its site is located near the modern village of Lechaio.

It was created with three internal and three external ports. The port had both commercial (for traffic with the western parts of Greece, with Italy and Sicily) and naval parts. One of the earliest active ports in Europe, it was in use as a commercial port as early as 1381 BC.

Many warehouses and other port facilities were built to handle the huge flows of goods. The first naval warfare industry developed with many naval shipyards such that in 334 BC Corinth contributed 160 fully equipped triremes to the fleet of Alexander the Great, while Athens could only give 20.

The proximity of Lechaeum to Corinth prevented it from becoming an important town like Piraeus. The only public building in the place mentioned by Pausanias who visited in the 2nd century, was a temple of Poseidon, Recent excavations have revealed a large Roman civic basilica dating to Augustus. The temple of Olympian Zeus was probably situated upon the low ground between Corinth and the shore of Lechaeum.

The Long Walls ran nearly due north and the space between them must have been considerable since there was sufficient space for an army to be drawn up for battle. Indeed, the area was the scene of battles between Sparta and Athens in 391 BC, leaving Spartans in command of Lechaeum, which they garrisoned with their troops (see Battle of Lechaeum).

A monumental Christian basilica of total length 180 has been excavated. It has five aisles and was dedicated to Leonidas, bishop of Athens, who was martyred in the mid-3rd century. It was most likely built after the 525 AD earthquake.
