= Evergetoulas =

Evergetoulas Ευεργέτουλας
- Municipal unit
- Location within the regional unit

- Location within Greece
- Coordinates: 39°07′N 26°25′E
- Country: Greece
- Administrative region: North Aegean
- Regional unit: Lesbos
- Municipality: Mytilene

Area
  - Municipal unit: 88.9 km^{2} (34.3 sq mi)

Population (2021)
  - Municipal unit: 2,438
  - Municipal unit density: 27.4/km^{2} (71.0/sq mi)
- Time zone: UTC+2 (EET)
  - Summer (DST): UTC+3 (EEST)
- Vehicle registration: MY

Evergetoulas (Greek: Ευεργέτουλας) is a former municipality on the island of Lesbos, North Aegean, Greece. Since the 2019 local government reform it is part of the municipality Mytilene, of which it is a municipal unit. It is located in the eastern part of the island, inland from the Aegean Sea, but on the Bay of Gera. It has a land area of 88.866 km². Its population was 2,438 at the 2021 census. The seat of the municipality was in Sykounta. Its largest towns are Íppeio, Káto Trítos, Kerameía, Sykoúnta, and Asómatos.
