= Perigiali =

Perigiali Περιγιάλι
- Community
- Location within Greece
- Coordinates: 37°56′17″N 22°50′10″E
- Country: Greece
- Administrative region: Peloponnese
- Regional unit: Corinthia
- Municipality: Corinth
- Municipal unit: Assos-Lechaio

Population (2021)
  - Community: 1,474
- Time zone: UTC+2 (EET)
  - Summer (DST): UTC+3 (EEST)

Perigiali (Greek: Περιγιάλι) is a seaside village in Corinthia, Greece. It was the seat of the former municipality of Assos-Lechaio. Its population at the 2021 census was 1,474.
