= Athikia =

Athikia Αθίκια
- Community
- Location within Greece
- Coordinates: 37°49′05″N 22°55′48″E
- Country: Greece
- Administrative region: Peloponnese
- Regional unit: Corinthia
- Municipality: Corinth
- Municipal unit: Saronikos

Population (2021)
  - Community: 1,942
- Time zone: UTC+2 (EET)
  - Summer (DST): UTC+3 (EEST)

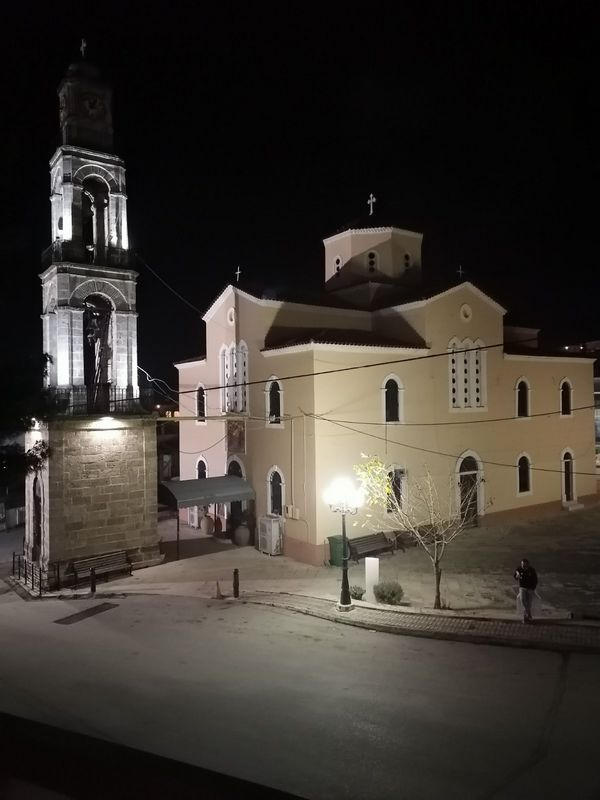
Church in the village of Athikia, Greece

Athikia (Greek: Αθίκια) is a village in the regional unit of Corinthia in Greece. It was the seat of the former municipality of Saronikos. Athikia has a population of 1,942 (2021 census) and is located 15 km (9.3 mi) south of the city of Corinth.
