= Ardassa =

Town in Western Macedonia, Greece

Ardassa Άρδασσα
- Community
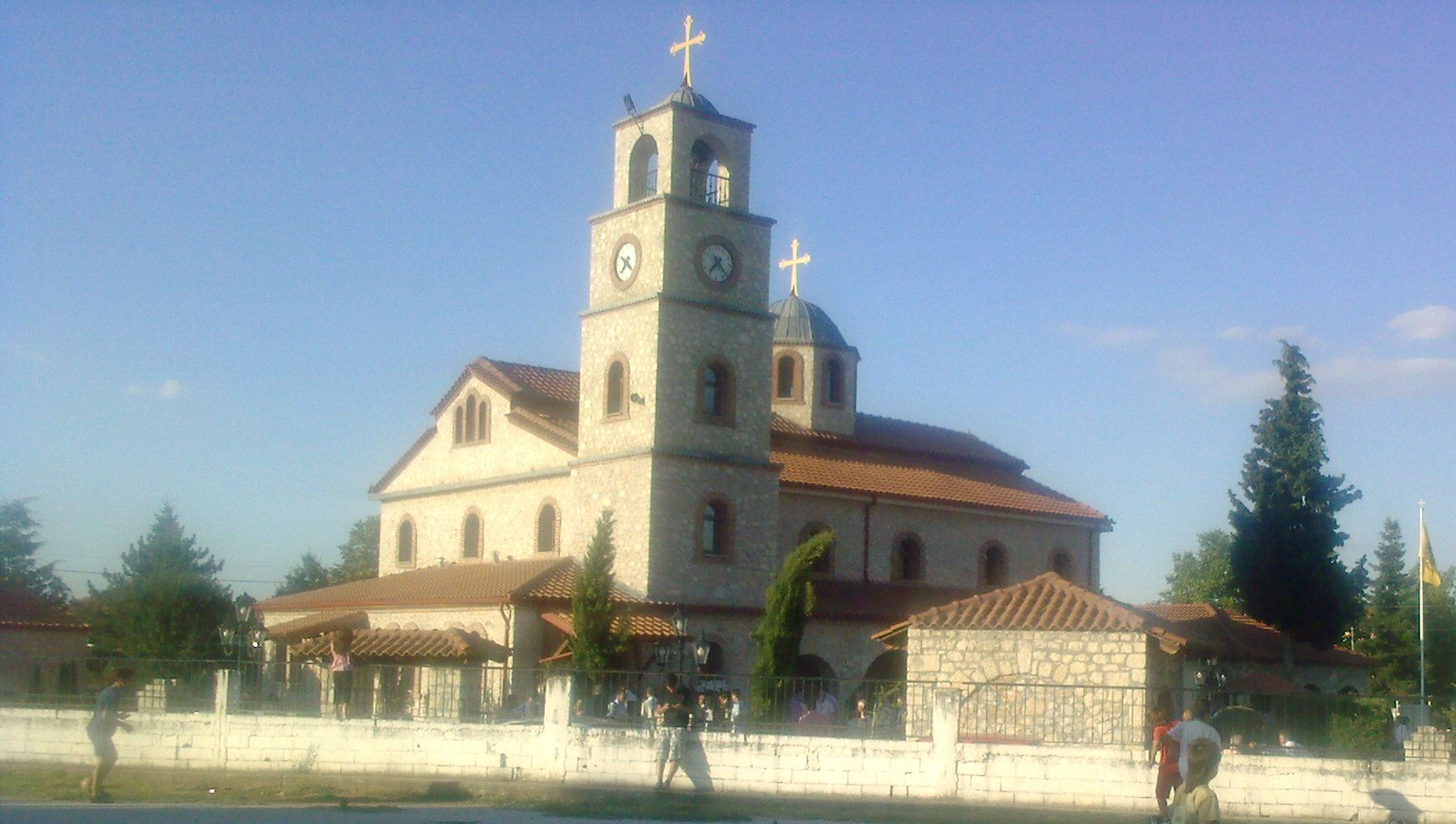
- Church of Ardassa

- Location within Greece
- Coordinates: 40°28′40″N 21°38′0″E
- Country: Greece
- Administrative region: Western Macedonia
- Regional unit: Kozani
- Municipality: Eordaia
- Municipal unit: Mouriki

Population (2021)
  - Community: 918
- Time zone: UTC+2 (EET)
  - Summer (DST): UTC+3 (EEST)
- Postal code: 50200

Ardassa, known before 1927 as Salpovo (Σούλποβο), (Greek: Άρδασσα, Macedonian: С’лпово, Bulgarian: Сълпово) is a small town in the Mouriki municipal unit, northern Kozani regional unit, Greece.
