= Loutropoli Thermis =

Loutropoli Thermis Λουτρόπολη Θερμής
- Municipal unit
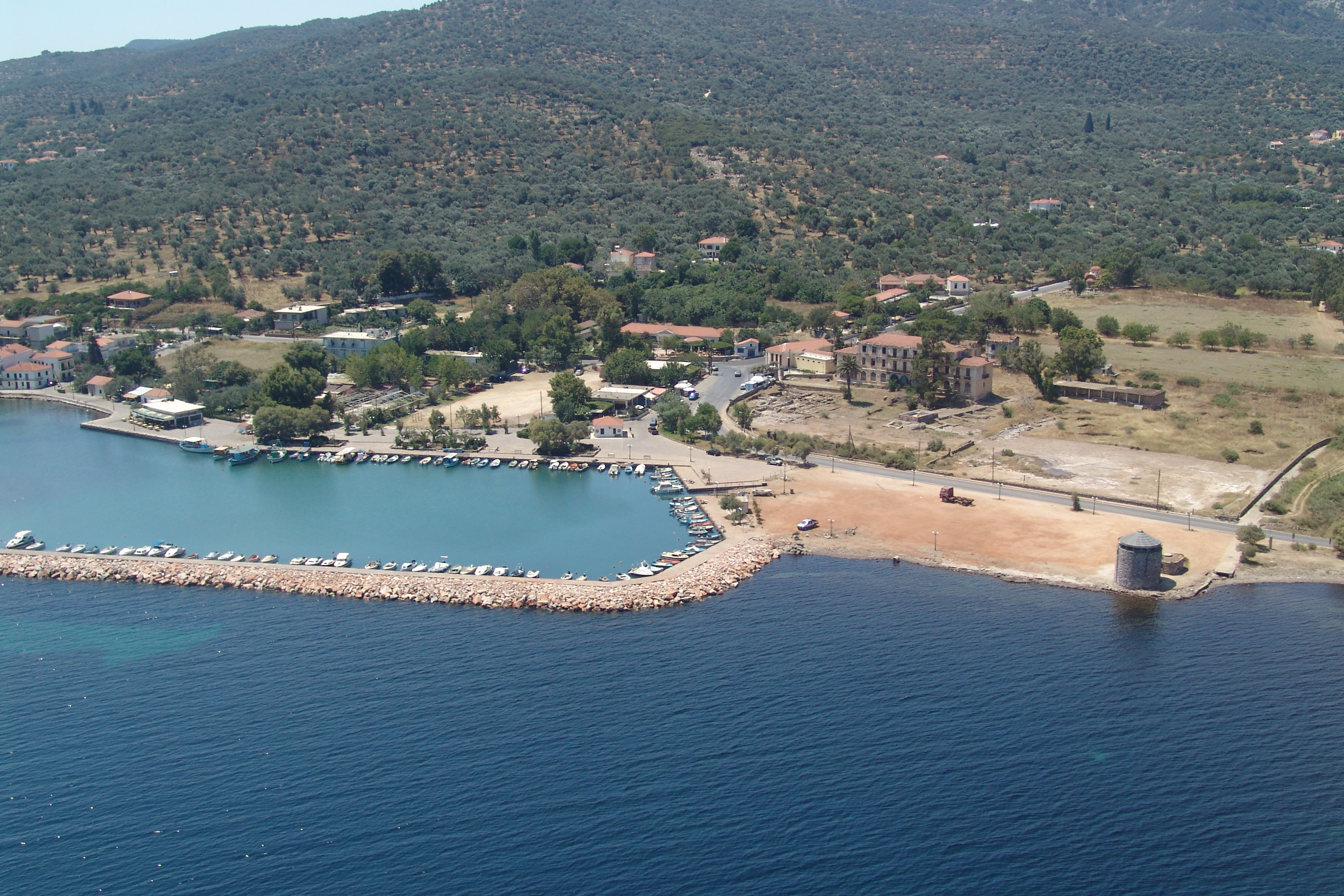
- Aerial view of Thermi port

- Location within the regional unit

- Location within Greece
- Coordinates: 39°11′N 26°29′E
- Country: Greece
- Administrative region: North Aegean
- Regional unit: Lesbos
- Municipality: Mytilene

Area
  - Municipal unit: 79.5 km^{2} (30.7 sq mi)

Population (2021)
  - Municipal unit: 2,772
  - Municipal unit density: 34.9/km^{2} (90.3/sq mi)
  - Community: 914
- Time zone: UTC+2 (EET)
  - Summer (DST): UTC+3 (EEST)
- Vehicle registration: MY

Loutropoli Thermis (Greek: Λουτρόπολη Θερμής) is a village and a former municipality on the island of Lesbos, North Aegean, Greece. Since the 2019 local government reform it is part of the municipality Mytilene, of which it is a municipal unit. It is located on the central east coast of the island. It has a land area of 79.468 km^{2}. Its population was 2,772 at the 2021 census. Loutrópoli Thermís was the seat of the municipality that comprises Loutrópoli Thermís, Pigi, Komi, Mistegna and Nees Kydonies. The largest towns are Loutrópoli Thermís, Mistegná, Nées Kydoníes, and Pigí.

== History ==
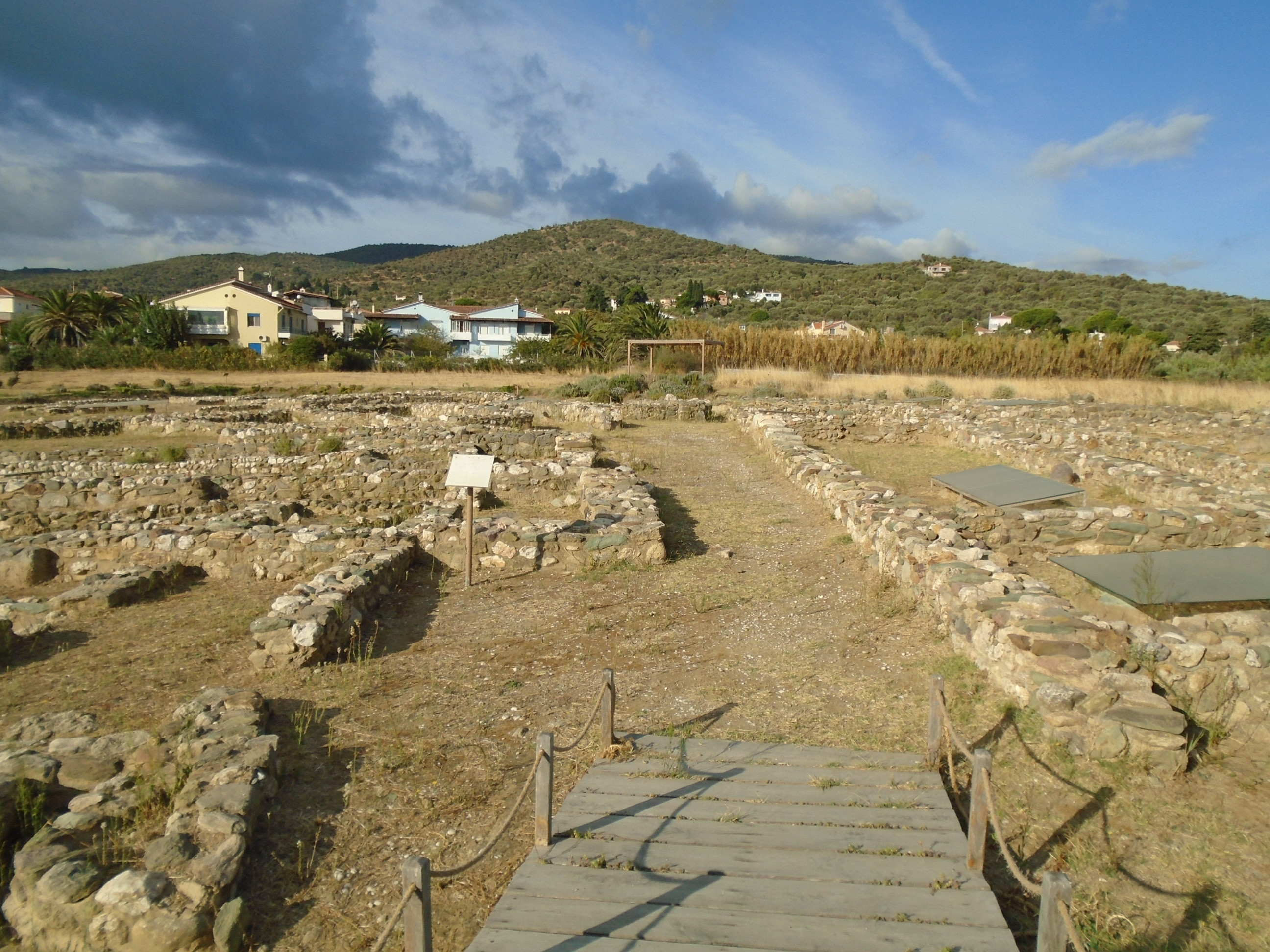
The prehistoric settlement of Thermi

The region of Thermi has a history going back five thousand years. The region takes its name from the thermal springs located there for centuries. Archaeological finds indicate that during the antiquity, the Greek goddess Artemis was worshipped as protector of the curative springs.

After archaeological excavations in the past years next to the beach, the layers and traces of five cities built one over the other were revealed, the oldest of which dates back to the middle of the 3rd millennium. The magnificence and the radiance of the religious and therapeutic centre of Thermi is also testified by numerous archaeological finds, including the foundations of buildings and inscriptions. Some of these relics are exhibited at the outdoor archaeological site of Horafa. At the beginning of the 20th century, the region of Thermi was popular for its luxurious hotel, Sarlitza Palace, which was built on the plans of French architects. For about thirty years, it received great recognition, attracting visitors and celebrities from all over the world. Today it is in decline and only the hot baths are operational.
