= Asprokampos =

Asprokampos Ασπρόκαμπος
- Community
- Location within Greece
- Coordinates: 37°53.2′N 22°33.7′E
- Country: Greece
- Administrative region: Peloponnese
- Regional unit: Corinthia
- Municipality: Sikyona
- Municipal unit: Stymfalia

Population (2021)
  - Community: 197
- Time zone: UTC+2 (EET)
  - Summer (DST): UTC+3 (EEST)
- Vehicle registration: ΚΡ

Asprokampos (Greek: Ασπρόκαμπος) is a village in the municipality of Sikyona, Corinthia, Greece. It is 8 km northeast of Lake Stymphalia, 11 km northwest of Nemea and 22 km southwest of Kiato. The village has about 200 inhabitants and is located at an altitude of 750 meters.
