= Assos-Lechaio =

Assos-Lechaio Άσσος-Λέχαιο
- Municipal unit
- Location within the regional unit

- Location within Greece
- Coordinates: 37°56′N 22°50′E
- Country: Greece
- Administrative region: Peloponnese
- Regional unit: Corinthia
- Municipality: Corinth

Area
  - Municipal unit: 25.49 km^{2} (9.84 sq mi)

Population (2021)
  - Municipal unit: 6,721
  - Municipal unit density: 263.7/km^{2} (682.9/sq mi)
- Time zone: UTC+2 (EET)
  - Summer (DST): UTC+3 (EEST)
- Postal code: 200 11
- Vehicle registration: ΚΡ

Assos-Lechaio (Greek: Άσσος-Λέχαιο) is a former municipality in Corinthia, Peloponnese, Greece. Since the 2011 local government reform it is part of the municipality Corinth, of which it is a municipal unit. The municipal unit has an area of 25.490 km^{2}. Population 6,721 (2021). The seat of the municipality was in Perigiali.
