= Skoutari, Serres =

Skoutari Σκουτάρι
- Municipal unit
- Location within the regional unit

- Location within Greece
- Coordinates: 41°01′N 23°31′E
- Country: Greece
- Administrative region: Central Macedonia
- Regional unit: Serres
- Municipality: Serres

Area
  - Municipal unit: 90.2 km^{2} (34.8 sq mi)

Population (2021)
  - Municipal unit: 4,666
  - Municipal unit density: 51.7/km^{2} (134/sq mi)
  - Community: 1,863
- Time zone: UTC+2 (EET)
  - Summer (DST): UTC+3 (EEST)
- Vehicle registration: ΕΡ

Skoutari (Greek: Σκούταρι) is a village and a former municipality in the Serres regional unit, Greece. Since the 2011 local government reform it is part of the municipality Serres, of which it is a municipal unit. The municipal unit has an area of 90.159 km^{2}. Population 4,666 (2021). The first villagers arrived from Minor Asia as refugees in October 1922. On 15 August 1924, the day of The Assumption of Mary into Heaven, refugees from Skoutari from Northern Thrace began to arrive, and finally settled in the region of today's village. That way the village took its name.
