= Solygeia =

Solygeia Σολυγεία
- Municipal unit
- Location within the regional unit

- Location within Greece
- Coordinates: 37°47′N 23°04′E
- Country: Greece
- Administrative region: Peloponnese
- Regional unit: Corinthia
- Municipality: Corinth

Area
  - Municipal unit: 179.46 km^{2} (69.29 sq mi)

Population (2021)
  - Municipal unit: 1,867
  - Municipal unit density: 10.40/km^{2} (26.94/sq mi)
- Time zone: UTC+2 (EET)
  - Summer (DST): UTC+3 (EEST)
- Postal code: 200 04
- Vehicle registration: ΚΡ

Solygeia (Greek: Σολυγεία) is a former municipality in Corinthia, Peloponnese, Greece. Since the 2011 local government reform it is part of the municipality Corinth, of which it is a municipal unit. The municipal unit has an area of 179.461 km^{2}. Population 1,867 (2021). The seat of the municipality was in Sofiko.
