= Saronikos, Corinthia =

Saronikos Σαρωνικός
- Municipal unit
- Location within the regional unit

- Location within Greece
- Coordinates: 37°49′N 22°56′E
- Country: Greece
- Administrative region: Peloponnese
- Regional unit: Corinthia
- Municipality: Corinth

Area
  - Municipal unit: 136.58 km^{2} (52.73 sq mi)

Population (2021)
  - Municipal unit: 4,700
  - Municipal unit density: 34/km^{2} (89/sq mi)
- Time zone: UTC+2 (EET)
  - Summer (DST): UTC+3 (EEST)
- Postal code: 200 05
- Vehicle registration: ΚΡ

Saronikos (Greek: Σαρωνικός) is a former municipality in Corinthia, Peloponnese, Greece. Since the 2011 local government reform it is part of the municipality Corinth, of which it is a municipal unit. The municipal unit has an area of 136.578 km^{2}. Population 4,700 (2021). The seat of the municipality was in Athikia.
