= Gera, Lesbos =

Gera Γέρα
- Municipal unit
- Location within the regional unit

- Location within Greece
- Coordinates: 39°02′N 26°27′E
- Country: Greece
- Administrative region: North Aegean
- Regional unit: Lesbos
- Municipality: Mytilene

Area
  - Municipal unit: 86.4 km^{2} (33.4 sq mi)

Population (2021)
  - Municipal unit: 5,592
  - Municipal unit density: 64.7/km^{2} (168/sq mi)
- Time zone: UTC+2 (EET)
  - Summer (DST): UTC+3 (EEST)
- Vehicle registration: MY

Gera or Yera (Greek: Γέρα) is a town on the Aegean island of Lesbos in Greece. It once stood as one of the largest ports of the island. According to scholars the ancient name may have been Portus Hieraeus; Pliny the Elder mentions a Lesbian city called Hiera, which was abandoned before his time.

== History ==
The 1st-century Roman historian and naturalist Pliny the Elder recorded the existence of an ancient city on Lesbos known as Hiera. Scholars argue that the name is derived from the Greek goddess Hera, and there is evidence that the island of Lesbos followed the cult of Hera during the time of Sappho around the 7th century B.C.

== Geography and administration ==
The Municipality of Gera was established with the Kapodistrias reform in 1997, with the capital at Pappados, covering a surface of 86.350 km2 (33.340 sq mi) and with a population of 5,592 in the 2021 census. Its largest towns are Skopelos, Palaiokipos, Mesagros, Perama, Pappados. It was again abolished in the 2010 Kallikratis reform. Since the 2019 local government reform, it is part of the municipality Mytilene.

=== Bay of Gera ===
The Bay of Gera is a wider area of Lesbos, with the main port today at Perama. The name has changed throughout history, and has been variously called Ieremidia, Gieremia, Geremia, Lichremadia, Maliae, Iero, Hiera, Giera, Keramia, Iera, Gera, Eleon, Olivier.

== Bibliography ==
- Robbins, Emmet (2013). Thalia Delighting in Song: Essays on Ancient Greek Poetry. University of Toronto Press. p. 126. ISBN 978-1-4426-1343-0.
- Bostock, John (1893). The Natural History of Pliny, Volume 1 By Pliny (the Elder.). George Bell and Sons. pp. 487–488.
