= Corinth (municipality) =

Municipality of Corinth Δήμος Κορινθίων
- Municipality
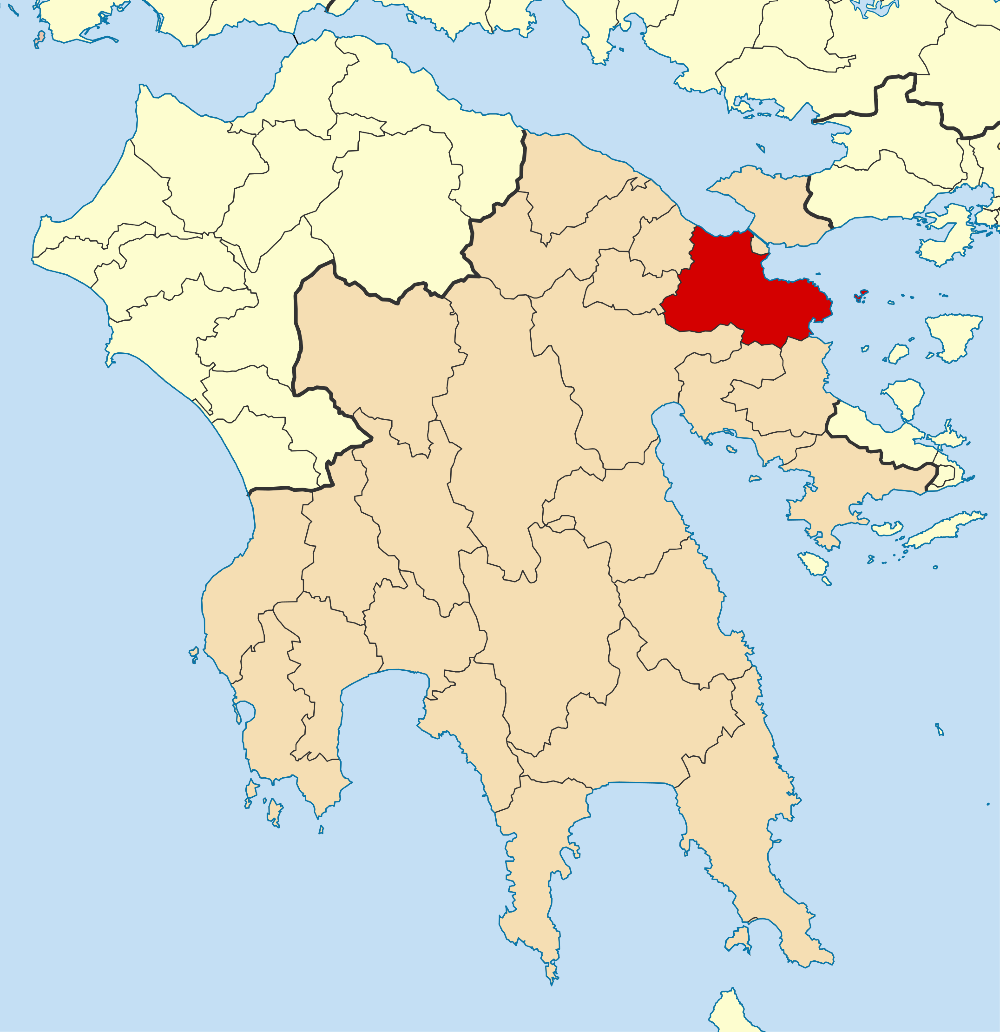

- Location within Greece
- Coordinates: 37°56′N 22°56′E
- Country: Greece
- Administrative region: Peloponnese
- Regional unit: Corinthia
- Municipality established: 2011 (enlarged)
- Seat: Corinth

Government
  - Mayor: Nikolaos Stavrelis (since 2023)

Area
  - Municipality: 611.29 km^{2} (236.02 sq mi)

Population (2021)
  - Municipality: 55,941
  - Density: 91.513/km^{2} (237.02/sq mi)
- Time zone: UTC+2 (EET)
  - Summer (DST): UTC+3 (EEST)
- Website: www.korinthos.gr

The municipality of Corinth is a Greek municipality located in the Peleponnese region established on 1 January 2011 under the Kallikratis Plan for local government reform. The municipality is made up of five previous municipalities: Assos-Lechaio, Corinth, Saronikos, Tenea and Solygeia. The area of the new municipality is 611.29 square kilometers and it has a population of 55,641, based on the 2021 census. The seat of the municipality is Corinth and its symbol is the Pegasus.
