= List of settlements in Corinthia =

This is a list of settlements in Corinthia, Greece.

- Agioi Theodoroi
- Agionori
- Agios Ioannis
- Agios Vasileios
- Aidonia
- Ancient Corinth
- Angelokastro
- Ano Trikala
- Archaia Feneos
- Archaia Nemea
- Archaies Kleones
- Asprokampos
- Assos
- Athikia
- Bolati
- Bozikas
- Chalkeio
- Chelydoreo
- Chiliomodi
- Corinth
- Dafni
- Dendro
- Derveni
- Dimini
- Drosopigi
- Elliniko
- Ellinochori
- Evangelistria
- Evrostina
- Examilia
- Feneos
- Galataki
- Galatas
- Geliniatika
- Gonoussa
- Goura
- Isthmia
- Kaisari
- Kalianoi
- Kallithea
- Kamari
- Karya
- Kastania
- Kastraki
- Katakali
- Kato Assos
- Kato Dimini
- Kato Loutro
- Kato Synoikia Trikalon
- Kato Tarsos
- Kefalari
- Kiato
- Klenia
- Klimenti
- Kokkoni
- Korfiotissa
- Korfos
- Koutalas
- Koutsi
- Krines
- Kryoneri
- Kyllini
- Lafka
- Lagkadaiika
- Laliotis
- Lechaio
- Leonti
- Loutraki-Perachora
- Lygia
- Lykoporia
- Manna
- Mati
- Megas Valtos
- Melissi
- Mesi Synoikia Trikalon
- Mesino
- Mikros Valtos
- Mosia
- Moulki
- Nees Vrysoules
- Nemea
- Nerantza
- Panariti
- Panorama
- Paradeisi
- Pasi
- Pellini
- Perigiali
- Petri
- Pisia
- Pitsa
- Poulitsa
- Psari
- Pyrgos
- Rethi
- Riza
- Sarantapicho
- Sikyona
- Sofiana
- Sofiko
- Solomos
- Souli
- Soulinari
- Stefani
- Steno
- Stimagka
- Stomio
- Stylia
- Stymfalia
- Sykia
- Tarsina
- Thalero
- Throfari
- Titani
- Velo
- Vochaiko
- Vrachati
- Xanthochori
- Xylokastro
- Xylokeriza
- Zemeno
- Zevgolateio

== See also ==
- List of towns and villages in Greece
