= Kryoneri =

Kryoneri (Greek: Κρυονέρι meaning "cold water") may refer to numerous settlements in Greece:

- Kryoneri, Achaea, a village in Achaea, part of the municipality Kalavryta
- Kryoneri, Aetolia-Acarnania, a village in Aetolia-Acarnania, part of the municipal unit Chalkeia
- Kryoneri, Attica, a community in East Attica
- Kryoneri, Corinthia, a village in Corinthia, part of the municipality Sikyona
- Kryoneri, Figaleia, a village in Elis, part of the municipality Figaleia
- Kryoneri, Olympia, a village in Elis, part of the municipality Archaia Olympia
- Kryoneri, Ioannina, a village in the Ioannina regional unit, part of the municipality Delvinaki
- Kryoneri, Karditsa, a village in the Karditsa regional unit
- Kryoneri, Kavala, a village in the Kavala regional unit, part of the municipal unit Filippoi
- Kryoneri, Laconia, a village in Laconia, part of the municipality Oitylo
- Kryoneri, Messenia, a village in Messenia, part of the municipality Aetos
- Kryoneri, Rethymno, a village in the Rethymno regional unit, part of the municipality Kouloukonas
- Kryoneri, Thesprotia, a village in Thesprotia, part of the municipality Filiates
- Kryoneri, Thessaloniki, a village in the Thessaloniki regional unit, part of the municipality Sochos

== See also ==
- Kryoneria, a village in Aetolia-Acarnania, part of the municipality Apodotia
- Kryonerida, a municipality in the Chania regional unit on Crete
- Kryoneritis, a village in Euboea, part of the municipality Istiaia
