= Pyrgos, Corinthia =

Pyrgos Πύργος
- Settlement
- Location within Greece
- Coordinates: 38°5′16″N 22°26′18″E
- Country: Greece
- Administrative region: Peloponnese
- Regional unit: Corinthia
- Municipality: Xylokastro-Evrostina
- Municipal unit: Evrostina
- Elevation: 600 m (2,000 ft)

Population (2021)
  - Total: 380
- Time zone: UTC+2 (EET)
  - Summer (DST): UTC+3 (EEST)
- Postal code: 200 09

Pyrgos (Greek: Πύργος) is a mountain village located in the southern part of Greece, on Peloponnese and is located in the western part of Corinthia. It is part of The Municipality of Xylokastro-Evrostina.

It is 10 kilometres south of Derveni and 66 kilometres northwest of Korinthos. From Athens, it takes approximately 2 hours with A8 Olympia Odos, the national road that connects Pyrgos Ilias with Elefsina Attikis, and a provincial road that connects Lygia with Pellini.

There is a local monument that is called Pyrgos Kordi (Greek: ο Πύργος του Κορδή) that Greeks used to fight against the Ottoman Turks, and now it is at the stages of transitioning into a museum, but is closed due to works.

Also, every May of the year, there is a marathon held that is called Kyriakidia (Greek: Κυριακίδια), in honor to a noble athlete that ran 42 km and gave the prize money ( 25,000€) to his fellow Greeks, Stelios Kyriakidis (Greek: Στέλιος Κυριακίδης). The marathon is also held in Filothei.

They have just one primary school because Pyrgos is too small. It is called The Primary School of Pyrgos (Greek: Δημοτικό Σχολείο Πύργου). While it still works under the umbrella of sch.gr, the kids at a higher age (ages 12-15) have to use the KTEL to go to the closest middle school, The Middle School of Derveni (Greek: Γυμνάσιο Δερβενίου). The kids aged 16 to 18 also use the KTEL to go to the High School of Derveni (Greek: Γενικό Λύκειο Δερβενίου).
