= Titane (disambiguation) =

Titane is a 2021 French body-horror film by Julia Ducournau.

Titane may also refer to:

- Titane (Sicyon), a city in ancient Greece
- Titani, a village (in modern-day Greece)
- Titanium(IV) hydride, a chemical compound
- Titans in Greek mythology
