= Battle of Agionori =

1822 battle

- Part of the Greek War of Independence
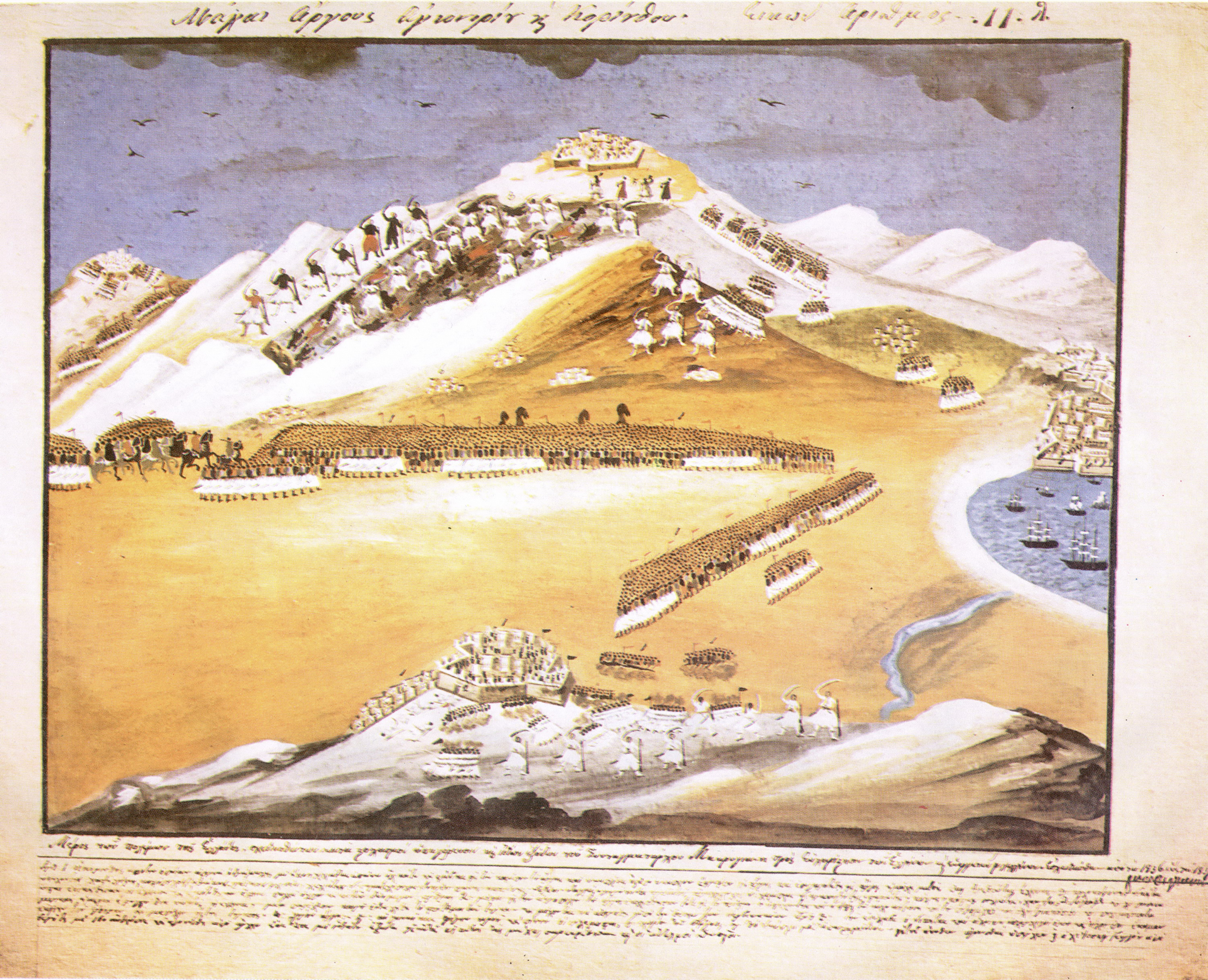
Date	28 July 1822
Location	Agionori, Corinth, Morea Eyalet, Ottoman Empire
Result	Greek victory

Belligerents
Greek revolutionaries	Ottoman Empire

Commanders and leaders
Nikitaras; Nikitas Flessas; Papaflessas	Mahmud Dramali Pasha

Casualties and losses
Unknown	600–1,000 dead

The Battle of Agionori was a military engagement of the Greek War of Independence. It took place on 28 July 1822, two days after the destruction of Dramali in Dervenakia. In this battle, the Greek leaders were Nikitaras, Nikitas Flessas and Papaflessas.

== The events before the battle ==
After the battle at Dervenakia, Theodoros Kolokotronis conceived and implemented a plan to completely block Dramali's army, which he expected would attempt to pass from Nafplio to Corinth. Ultimately, the plan was not implemented properly, resulting in the Turks fleeing to Agionori, where the only one left to face them was Nikitaras with Nikitas Flessas. On the night of 27/28 July, Dramali learned that the Berbatios ravine was unguarded and decided to pass through it to reach the Agionori road and from there, via Klenia, to reach Corinth.

== The battle ==
At first, Dramali turned against Nikitaras's corps at Agios Vasileios, which was more isolated and left a small force on the road to Agionori to occupy the Flessaians. Nikitara's men suffered losses and began to retreat towards Stefani, where they resisted effectively, assisted by Nikitas Flessas' corps. Finally, the Turks, caught between two fires, were defeated, losing at least 600 men (many historians put the losses at 1,000 men). They would have suffered greater losses if the Greeks had continued to pursue them, but it seems that they were dazzled by the rich loot and stopped. Only Nikitaras with a few men continued the pursuit, helped by the women of Agionori who threw stones at the Turks from above. Thus, a large number of the defeated escaped, along with Dramali's himself, to Corinth where they were again blocked by the Greeks.

== The end of Dramali's army ==
In August and September 1822, Dramali regrouped the remnants of his army and tried three times to break through the Greek encirclement, unsuccessfully. After these failures, he tried to help the Turkish besieged Nafplio. In late October or November 1822, he died of grief or typhus. His men, based in Corinth, repeatedly supplied Nafplio and, after the fall of the latter, those who remained from illness and hardship fled to Patras, leaving a garrison of 500 men in Acrocorinth.

== Sources ==
- Σφυρόερας, Βασίλειος (1975) [1956]. Ιστορία του Ελληνικού Έθνους - Η Ελληνική Επανάσταση (1821-1832). Vol. ΙΒ΄. Αθήνα: Εκδοτική Αθηνών. pp. 256–257.
