= Titana =

Titana may refer to:

- Lecithocera, a genus of insect
- Titana (Sicyon), a town of ancient Greece
