= Geliniatika =

Geliniatika Γελινιάτικα
- Community
- Location within Greece
- Coordinates: 38°03′36″N 22°39′07″E
- Country: Greece
- Administrative region: Peloponnese
- Regional unit: Corinthia
- Municipality: Xylokastro-Evrostina
- Municipal unit: Xylokastro

Population (2021)
  - Community: 379
- Time zone: UTC+2 (EET)
  - Summer (DST): UTC+3 (EEST)

Geliniatika (Greek: Γελινιάτικα; Geliniátika) is a village and a community belonging to the municipality of Xylokastro-Evrostina, in the regional unit of Corinthia, Greece. The next major settlement is Sykia, approximately 4 km to the north. The local economy is mainly based on traditional smallholding.

At the entrance of the village is the church of St Nicholas which was built around 1960, where originally stood the smaller church of St Nicholas which was built in 1870. Geliniatika village was settled a few years before the 1821 Revolution, by residents from the nearby mountainous Gelini, who would come down towards the coast with their herds to pass the winter, or to find work from the Turkish settlers.

Later, the village was used as a place to pass the winter by the residents of the higher up Spartineika community and a few residents of the Lagkadeika community. Nowadays all of Geliniatika's residents are permanent and few go up to Spartineika for the summer.

Primary school students were first taught from 1845-1855 in various homes in the village. In 1900 the first primary school was built; however in 1935 it was demolished. The building of the current primary school commenced in 1932 with the help of the then Education Minister P. Petridis and was completed in November 1935, at the time of Prime Minister Panagis Tsardaris.
