= Manna, Greece =

Settlement in Corinthia, Greece

Manna Μάννα
- Settlement
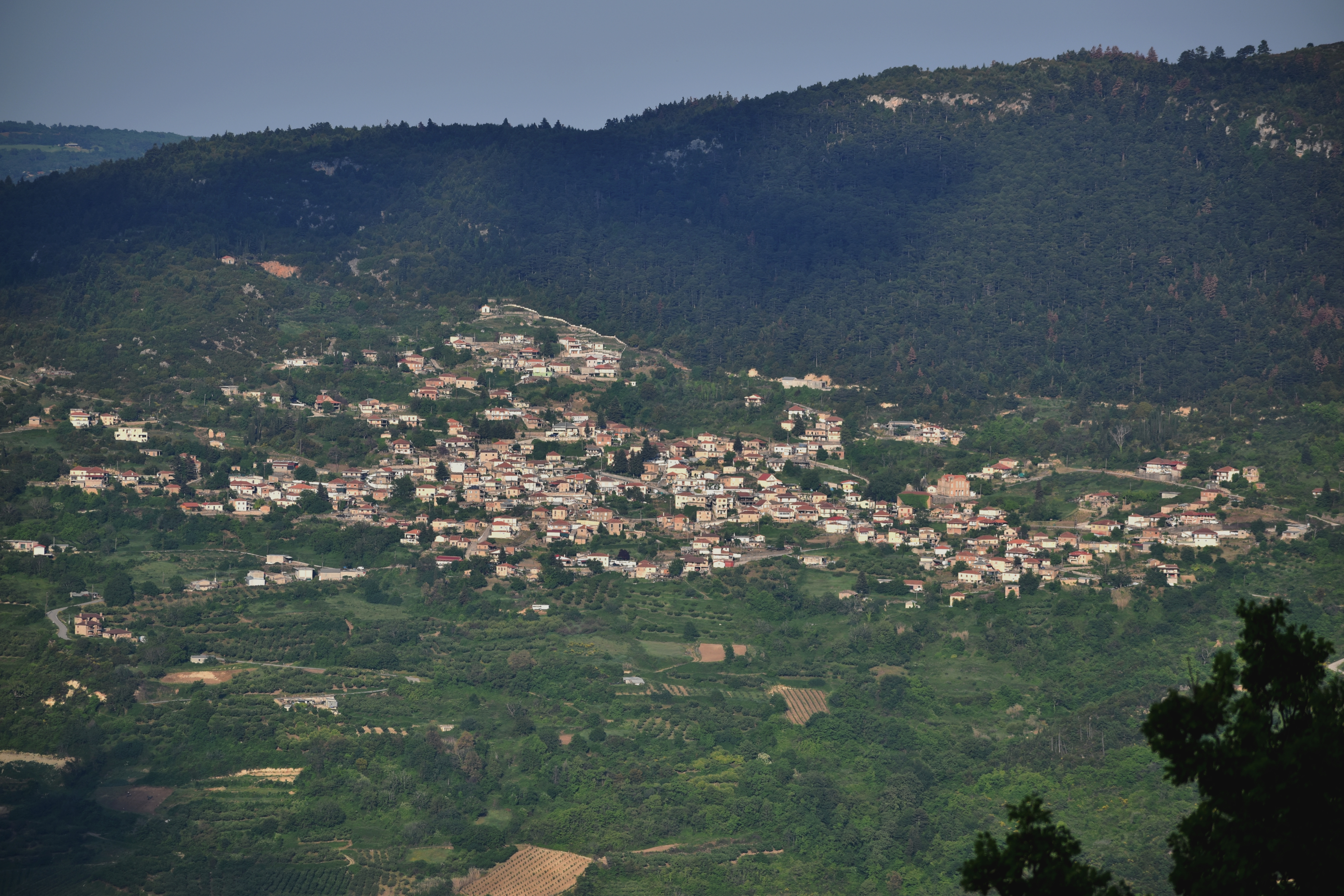
- View of Manna

- Location within Greece
- Coordinates: 37°58′44″N 22°30′40″E
- Country: Greece
- Administrative region: Peloponnese
- Regional unit: Corinthia
- Municipality: Xylokastro-Evrostina
- Municipal unit: Xylokastro

Population (2021)
  - Community: 340
- Time zone: UTC+2 (EET)
  - Summer (DST): UTC+3 (EEST)

Manna (Greek: Μάννα, before 1927: Μάρκασι - Markasi) is a village in Corinthia, southern Greece. It is a community of the municipal unit Xylokastro. It resides at the mountain foot of Ziria at an elevation of 850m. The name originates from a spring in the village. Before that the village was named Markasi which is an Arvanite word that means Maria's eyebrow because of the mountain line above the village which looks like an eyebrow.

== History ==
The village was founded in 1800 from Arvanite colonists of Tosk Albanian heritage that came from Barbitsa and from Lagadia Arkadias. Members of the family Barbitsioti settled in Markasi at around 1820. The village participated in the revolution of 1821 against the Turks. Under the leadership of Basili Barbitsioti they fortified under a rock at the entrance of the village and drive the Turks away many times. At that time the family Barbitsioti built the church of Ag. Dimitrios. During World War II the village was the only one that wasn't demolished by the Germans because the women of the village found a dead German that was killed during a battle and buried him with all the honors they buried a Greek man. So the German commander ordered not to harm anybody and not destroy the village. The village has a church Ag. Konstantinos-Elenis which was built from the stones the villagers carried from the mountain at 1880. When the earthquakes of 1921 struck, two large rocks fell off the mountain 6mX4m but they stopped right before the church and did not destroy the homes of the villagers.

Another spring that resides in the village has the phenomenon of tide for 6 hours the water is released and for another 6 it is not. The phenomenon is inexplicable yet because there are no similar phenomena in the greater area of Corinth.

The mountain is private because the citizens have bought it from Notara after the revolution. The economy is based on agricultural production. The village produces apples, oil and other fruits. The apples are famous in Greece like the apples from Pilio.

== Population ==
Year	Population
1879	609
1889	700
1907	908
1928	1024
1940	1249
1951	977
1971	765
1991	670
2011	476
2021	340

== See also ==
- List of settlements in Corinthia
