= Avgi, Thessaloniki =

Avgi Αυγή
- Settlement
- Location within Greece
- Coordinates: 40°48.8′N 23°18.9′E
- Country: Greece
- Administrative region: Central Macedonia
- Regional unit: Thessaloniki
- Municipality: Lagkadas
- Municipal unit: Sochos
- Community: Kryoneri
- Elevation: 620 m (2,030 ft)

Population (2021)
  - Total: 267
- Time zone: UTC+2 (EET)
  - Summer (DST): UTC+3 (EEST)
- Postal code: 570 02
- Area code: +30-2395
- Vehicle registration: NA to NX

Avgi (Greek: Αυγή) is a village of the Lagkadas municipality, northern Greece. Before the 2011 local government reform it was part of the municipality of Sochos. The 2021 census recorded 267 inhabitants in the village. Avgi is a part of the community of Kryoneri.

== See also ==
- List of settlements in the Thessaloniki regional unit
