= Agios Vasileios, Corinthia =

Agios Vasileios Άγιος Βασίλειος
- Community
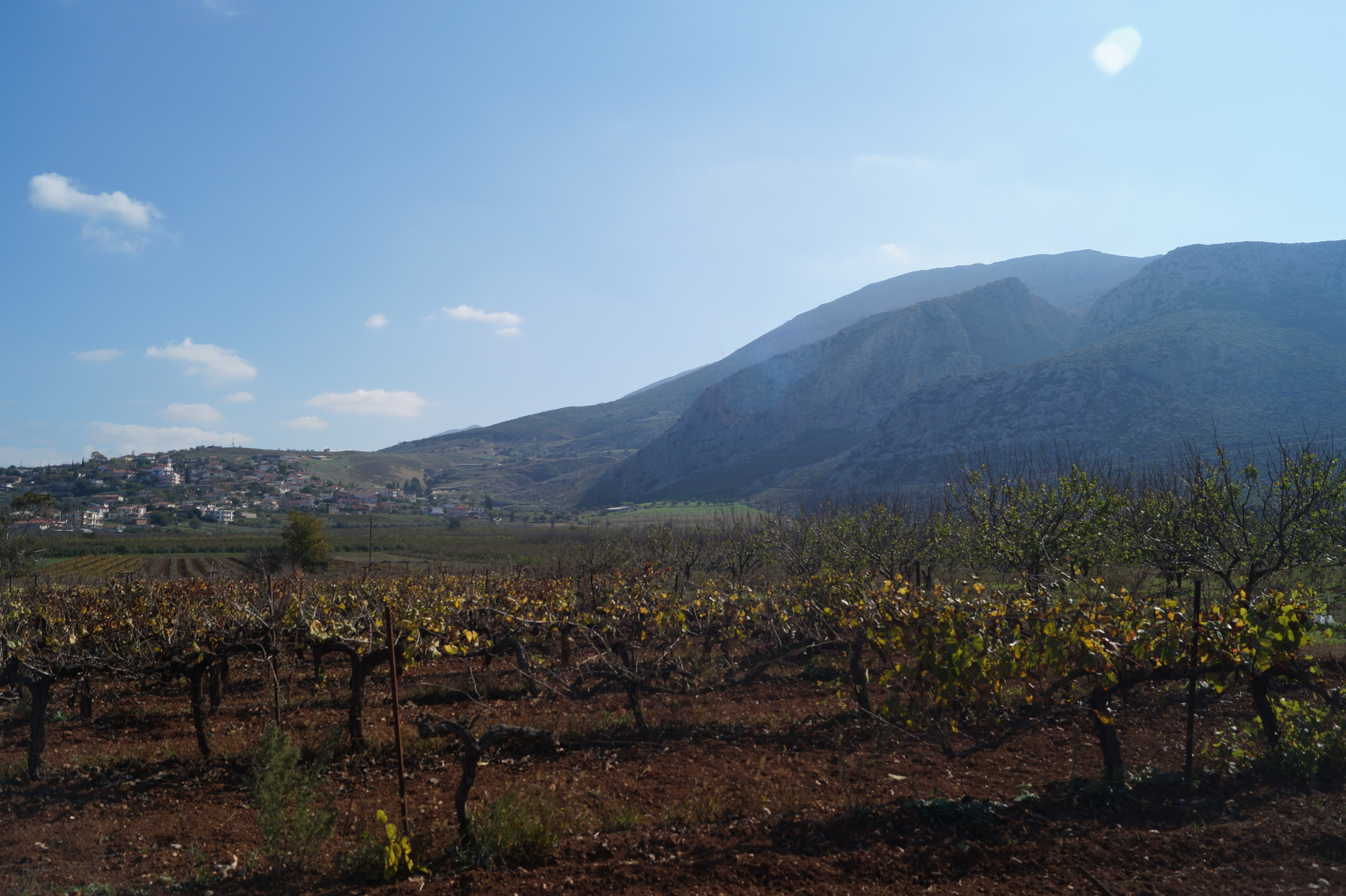

- Location within Greece
- Coordinates: 37°47′36″N 22°48′05″E
- Country: Greece
- Administrative region: Peloponnese
- Regional unit: Corinthia
- Municipality: Corinth
- Municipal unit: Tenea
- Elevation: 300 m (980 ft)

Population (2021)
  - Community: 1,025
- Time zone: UTC+2 (EET)
  - Summer (DST): UTC+3 (EEST)
- Postal code: 205 00
- Area code: 27410
- Vehicle registration: ΚΡ

Agios Vasileios (Greek: Άγιος Βασίλειος meaning Saint Basil) is a village in the municipal unit of Tenea in Corinthia, Greece.

It is located about 25 km to the south of the city of Corinth, approximately halfway along the EO7 road to Argos. It lies at the foot of the Dafnias mountains and the Chouni Pass.

== Historical population ==
| Year | Population |
|---|---|
| 1981 | 1,352 |
| 1991 | 1,320 |
| 2001 | 1,418 |
| 2011 | 1,264 |
| 2021 | 1,025 |

== Historical overview ==
=== Prehistory ===
Archaeological excavations prove that the area around Agios Vasilios has been settled since pre-historical times. Zygouries, west of Agios Vasilios, was excavated by the American archaeologist Carl William Blegen in the 1920s. He found a Bronze Age settlement dating from approximately 1300 BC to 1320 BC. Sadly, agricultural work and forestry on Zygouries hill has destroyed one of the most important pre-historical settlements of the Balkans.

Obsidian, sherds of which can be found over the whole area (particularly south of Agios Sostis (the cave of Antonis in the area of Boubakia), in the Chouni Pass southwest of the village, or near the caves on Dafnias mountain) are further proof of prehistoric settlement.

=== Roman period ===
Roman emperor Hadrian’s aqueduct from Lake Stymfalia passed through the village of Agios Vasilios. Traces of it are still visible west of the village at the entrance to the Chouni Pass as well as in the village on the properties of Kafandaris and Vardakas. The settlement on the hill of present-day Archaies Kleones ("Ancient Cleonae"), northwest of Agios Vasilios, was an important Roman settlement. Homer described the town as well built. Today, remains of the walls of an acropolis have been preserved on the northern part of the hill of Archaies Kleones. Recent archaeological excavations have uncovered a farmstead of a wealthy farmer with very beautiful mosaics in the area of Varella, northeast of Kleones.

=== Frankish, Venetian and Ottoman rules ===
The Frankish fortress, the ruins of which lie north of the village on Dafnias mountain overlooking the Chouni Pass, was built sometime between 1204 and 1250. It was built on the site of an earlier Mycenean fort. The archaeologist A. Bon, who excavated the fortress, was of the opinion that the fortress measured 225 m by 130 m in size.

In 1365, the fortress was listed in a tax document as belonging to the Florentine banker Niccolò Acciaioli. The same document also suggests that with the development of the fortress, the village had become a centre for the surrounding area. This is the earliest reference to the actual name Agios Vasilios in any historical document.

In 1377, Agios Vasilios (as Castello de Sancto Basile) is listed as one of the nine fortresses which existed in the Principality of Achaea. The town was described as having 85 houses. It was also claimed that it was the second largest settlement after Corinth in the principality.

In 1463, the village fell to the Venetians during the first Venetian-Ottoman war. In 1467, 1469, and 1471 the fortress was destroyed by various rulers. The Venetian census of 1700, shows Agios Vasilios as having 27 families and 97 dwellers. The villagers were on average less than fifty years old.

=== After the Ottoman rule ===
On 26 July 1822 the Battle of Dervenakia (or Agios Sostis) took place, which saw the defeat and elimination of the Ottoman forces under Dramali. After this battle, Kolokotronis placed guards in the fortress of Agios Vasilios in order to prevent Ottoman supplies passing through the Chouni Pass.ff

In 1836 the village was declared a municipality (dimos) and included the villages of Stefani, Archaies Kleones and Vousbardi. In 1845, the municipalities of Agios Vasilios and Archaies Kleones were united. In 1885, Agios Vasilios had 700 inhabitants. In 1912 the village was reduced to the status of kinotita or commune, consisting of one parish. In 1972 an additional parish, Agios Dimitrios, was created in the village.

=== Present ===
In the mid-20th century, Agios Vasilios was famed for its honey melons. Today, the farms of the village produce olives, apricots, wheat, wine, tobacco and vegetables.

== Sources ==
- Jannis Koutsoukos, Notes on the history of Agios Vasileios, Corinth 2005.

== See also ==
- List of settlements in Corinthia
