= Akrata railway station =

Railway station in Achaea, Greece

Ακράτα Akrata

General information
- Location: Κράθι 250 06, Achaea; Greece
- Coordinates: 38°07′56″N 22°26′24″E
- Owner: GAIAOSE
- Operator: Hellenic Train
- Line: Airport–Patras railway
- Platforms: 2 (side platforms)
- Tracks: 4

Construction
- Structure type: at-grade
- Platform levels: 2
- Parking: Yes
- Cycle facilities: No

Other information
- Status: Unstaffed
- Website: http://www.ose.gr/en/

Key dates
- 22 June 2020: Opened

Services
Preceding station	Hellenic Train	Following station
Platanos towards Aigio	G7 Kiato-Aigio	Lygia towards Kiato
Location

Akrata railway station (Greek: Σιδηροδρομικός Σταθμός Ακράτα, romanized: Sidirodromikós Stathmós Akrata) is a railway station in Akrata, a small seaside town in Achaea, Greece. It is located just south of Akrata, close to the Olympia Odos motorway. The station is currently served by Hellenic Train local services between Kiato and Aigio.

The station originally opened in 1887, as part of the Piraeus–Patras railway: the line closed on 9 July 2007, and the station was rebuilt as part of the extension of the standard gauge Athens Airport–Patras railway to Aigio, co-financed by the European Union's Cohesion Fund 2000–2006. The new station opened on 22 June 2020.

== History ==
The Station opened 22 June 2020 by Minister of Transport, Kostas Karamanlis. as part of the €848-million ERGOSE project extension of the Athens Airport–Patras railway to Aigio railline co-financed by the European Union's Cohesion Fund 2000–2006. It was one of three new stations in (Xylokastro, Akrata, and Aegio) and six holts (Diminio, Lykoporia, Lygia, Platanos Beach, Diakopto, and Eliki) to come online when the section of track opened. It should not be confused with the now-closed station on the old Piraeus–Patras railway SPAP, which is located northeast of the current station, closer to the coast of the Corinthian Gulf.

The station is owned by GAIAOSE, which since 3 October 2001 owns most railway stations in Greece: the company was also in charge of rolling stock from December 2014 until October 2025, when Greek Railways (the owner of the Airport–Patras railway) took over that responsibility.

== Facilities ==
The raised station is assessed via stairs or a ramp. It has two side platforms, with station buildings located on platform 1, with access to the platform level via stairs or lifts. The Station buildings are equipped with a booking office (not yet operational) and toilets. At platform level, there are sheltered seating, an air-conditioned indoor passenger shelter (as of 2020 not open) and Dot-matrix display departure and arrival screens and timetable poster boards on both platforms. There is a large car park on-site, adjacent to the eastbound line. Currently, there is no local bus stop connecting the station.

== Services ==
Since 22 November 2025, the following services call at this station:

- Hellenic Train local service between Kiato and Aigio, with six trains per day in each direction: passengers have to change at Kiato for Athens Suburban Railway trains towards Athens and Piraeus.

== Station layout ==
Ground level	Customer service	Exit/Tickets
Level; Ε1	Side platform, doors will open on the right
Level; Ε1	Platform 1	Hellenic Train to Aigio (Platanos) ←
Level; Ε1	Through Lines	not in use
Level; Ε1	Platform 2	Hellenic Train to Kiato (Lygia) →
Level; Ε1	Side platform, doors will open on the right

== See also ==
- Railway stations in Greece
- Hellenic Railways Organization
- Hellenic Train
- Proastiakos
