= Bembina (Argolis) =

Bembina (Ancient Greek: Βέμβινα) was a village of ancient Argolis. Strabo says that it was a small village that was located between Cleonae and Phlius, near Nemea. According to Greek mythology, the haunts of the Nemean Lion are said to have been near Bembina.

Its site is unlocated.
