= Lykoporia railway station =

Railway station in Corinthia, Greece

Λυκοποριά Lykoporia

General information
- Location: Lykoporia; Corinthia; Greece
- Coordinates: 38°07′29″N 22°30′23″E
- Owner: GAIAOSE
- Operator: Hellenic Train
- Line: Airport–Patras railway
- Platforms: 2 (side platforms)
- Tracks: 2

Construction
- Structure type: at-grade
- Platform levels: 2
- Parking: No
- Cycle facilities: No

Other information
- Status: Unstaffed
- Website: http://www.ose.gr/en/

Key dates
- 22 June 2020: Opened

Services
Preceding station	Hellenic Train	Following station
Lygia towards Aigio	G7 Kiato-Aigio	Xylokastro towards Kiato
Location

Lykoporia railway station (Greek: Σιδηροδρομικός Σταθμός Λυκοποριάς, romanized: Sidirodromikós Stathmós Lykoporia) is a Station in Lykoporia, a small seaside town in Corinthia, Greece. It is located just south of Lykoporia, close to the Olimpia Odos motorway. It was opened on 22 June 2020 as part of the €848-million ERGOSE project extension of the Athens Airport–Patras railway to Aigio rail line, co-financed by the European Union's Cohesion Fund 2000–2006. The station is served by Hellenic Train local services between Kiato and Aigio. It should not be confused with the now-closed station on the old Piraeus–Patras railway, which is located northeast of the current station, closer to the coast of the Corinthian Gulf

== History ==
The Station opened 22 June 2020 by Minister of Transport, Kostas Karamanlis. as part of the €848-million ERGOSE project extension of the Athens Airport–Patras railway to Aigio railline co-financed by the European Union's Cohesion Fund 2000–2006. It was one of three new stations in (Xylokastro, Akrata, and Aegio) and six holts (Diminio, Lykoporia, Lygia, Platanos Beach, Diakopto, and Eliki) to come online when the section of track opened. It should not be confused with the now-closed station on the old Piraeus–Patras railway SPAP, which is located northeast of the current station, closer to the coast of the Corinthian Gulf.

The station is owned by GAIAOSE, which since 3 October 2001 owns most railway stations in Greece: the company was also in charge of rolling stock from December 2014 until October 2025, when Greek Railways (the owner of the Airport–Patras railway) took over that responsibility.

== Facilities ==
The raised station is assessed via stairs or a ramp. It has two side platforms, with station buildings located below the platform level, with access to the platform level via stairs or lifts. The Station buildings are equipped only with a waiting area. At platform level, both platforms have sheltered seating and Dot-matrix display departure and arrival screens and timetable poster boards. There is currently no car park on-site. Currently, there is no local bus stop connecting the station.

== Services ==
Since 22 November 2025, the following services call at this station:

- Hellenic Train local service between Kiato and Aigio, with six trains per day in each direction: passengers have to change at Kiato for Athens Suburban Railway trains towards Athens and Piraeus.

== Station layout ==
Ground level	Customer service	Exit/Tickets
Level; Ε1	Side platform, doors will open on the right
Level; Ε1	Platform 1	Hellenic Train to Aigio (Lygia) ←
Level; Ε1	Platform 2	Hellenic Train to Kiato (Xylokastro) →
Level; Ε1	Side platform, doors will open on the right

== See also ==
- Hellenic Railways Organization
- TrainOSE
- Proastiakos
- P.A.Th.E./P.
