= Zante currant =

Variety of grape

Zante currants
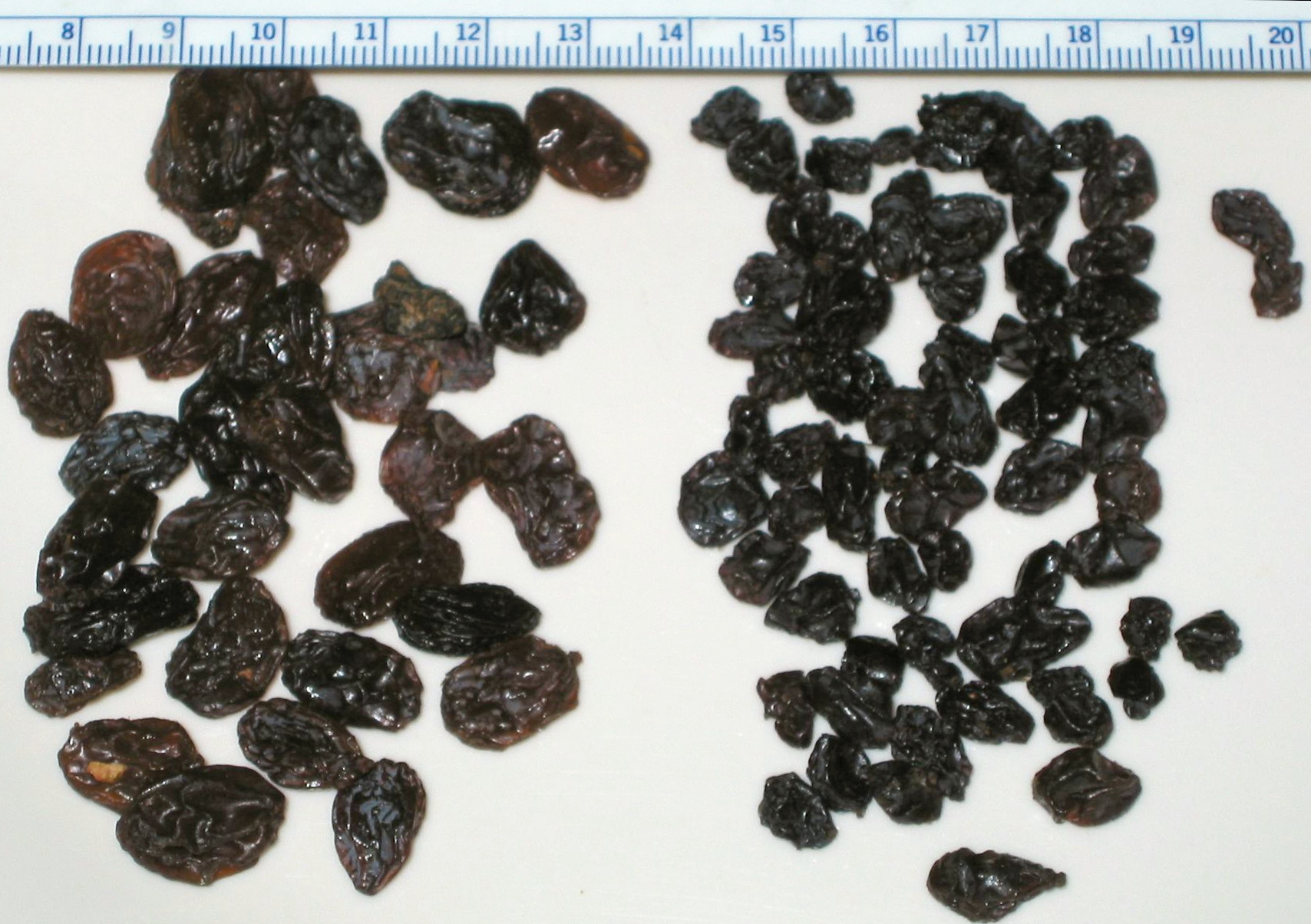
- Left: Thompson Seedless grape raisins. Right: Zante currants.

Nutritional value per 100 g (3.5 oz)
- Energy: 1,220 kJ (290 kcal)
- Carbohydrates: 77 g
- Sugars: 62.3 g
- Dietary fiber: 4.4 g
- Fat: 0.22 g
- Protein: 3.43 g
Vitamins and minerals
Vitamins	Quantity %DV^{†}
Thiamine (B1)	13% 0.16 mg
Riboflavin (B2)	11% 0.142 mg
Niacin (B3)	10% 1.615 mg
Pantothenic acid (B5)	1% 0.045 mg
Vitamin B6	17% 0.296 mg
Folate (B9)	3% 10 μg
Choline	2% 10.6 mg
Vitamin C	5% 4.7 mg
Vitamin E	1% 0.11 mg
Vitamin K	3% 3.3 μg
Minerals	Quantity %DV^{†}
Calcium	7% 88 mg
Iron	10% 1.88 mg
Magnesium	9% 36 mg
Manganese	15% 0.345 mg
Phosphorus	8% 99 mg
Potassium	26% 777 mg
Sodium	2% 43 mg
Zinc	3% 0.37 mg
- Link to USDA Database entry
- ^{†}Percentages estimated using US recommendations for adults, except for potassium, which is estimated based on expert recommendation from the National Academies.

Zante currants, Corinth raisins, Corinthian raisins or simply currants, are raisins of the small, sweet, seedless grape cultivar Black Corinth (Vitis vinifera). The name comes from the Anglo-French phrase "raisins de Corinthe" (grapes of Corinth) and the Ionian island of Zakynthos (Zante), which was once the major producer and exporter. It is not related to black, red or white currants, which are berries of shrubs in the genus Ribes and not usually prepared in dried form.

== History ==
The Zante currant is one of the oldest known raisins. The first written record of the grape was made in 75 AD by Pliny the Elder, who described a tiny, juicy, thin-skinned grape with small bunches. The next mention is a millennium later, when the raisins became a subject of trade between Venetian merchants and Greek producers from Ionian coasts. In the 14th century, they were sold in the English market under the label Reysyns de Corauntz, and the name raisins of Corinth was recorded in the 15th century, after the Greek harbor which was the primary source of export. Gradually, the name was altered to currant. By the 17th century trade shifted towards the Ionian islands, particularly Zakynthos (Zante), resulting in the name Zante currant.

=== In the U.S. ===
The first attempts to introduce the Black Corinth cultivar in the United States date back to 1854. The first successful vineyards of White and Red Corinth (related varieties), were established in California in 1861 by Colonel Ágoston Haraszthy. Around 1901, David Fairchild of USDA imported high-quality black currant cuttings from the Greek village of Panariti, a renowned producer, and established the first commercial crops. However, because of the higher popularity of Thompson Seedless, American production remained modest up to 1920s and 1930s, after which its popularity increased because of the higher prices it could bring and improved cultivation practices such as girdling. The plantings reached 3,000 acres (1,200 ha) by 1936, and have plateaued there since.

== Description ==
In wild grapes, the species is dioecious; the sexes grow on separate vines with male flowers on one plant, and female flowers on another. Black Corinth is an "almost male" variety in that the flowers have well-developed anthers (male), but only tiny underdeveloped ovaries (female).

Clusters of Black Corinth are small, averaging 6.3 oz (180 g) and ranging from 3.2 to 9.5 oz (91 to 269 g). They are cylindrical, with prominent shoulder or winged. The berries are very small 0.012–0.021 oz (0.34–0.60 g), round, and of a reddish black color. The skin is very thin, and the flesh is juicy and soft. It is practically seedless, except in an occasional large berry. When dried, the raisins weigh 0.0032–0.0049 oz (0.091–0.139 g) and are dark brown or black. Leaves are medium-sized, heart-shaped, and oblong. They are five-lobed with deep sinuses.

== Cultivation ==
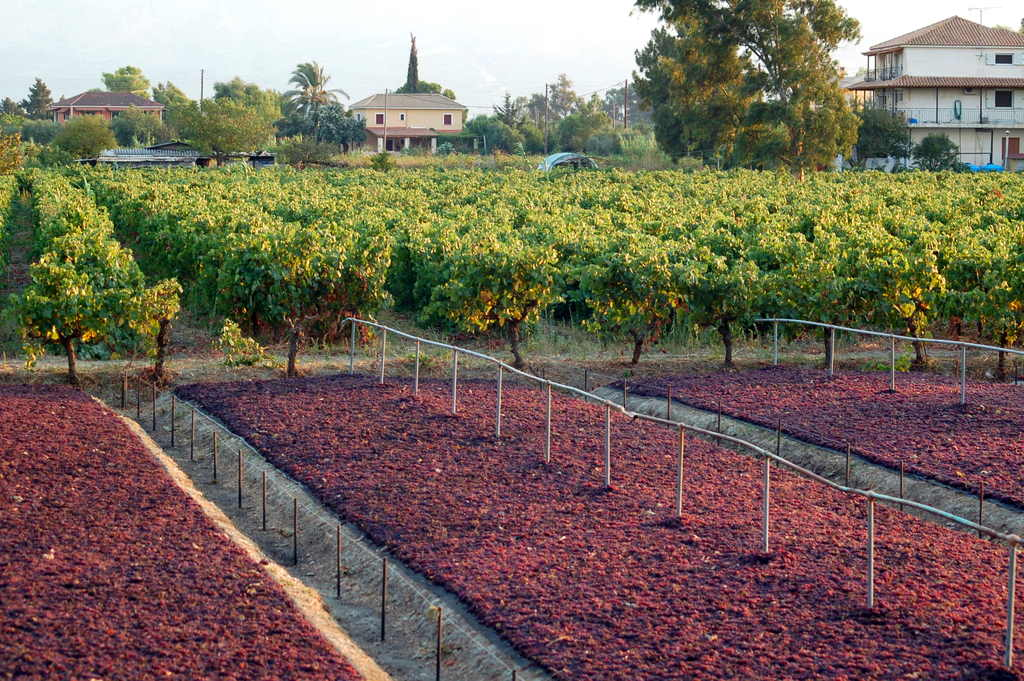
Sun-drying Zante currants on Zakynthos, with the grape vineyard in the background

To yield sufficient fruit, Black Corinth grapes need to be carefully managed. In ancient times, girdling was a standard practice to increase the set and size of seedless grapes, until the discovery of the plant hormone gibberellic acid, and its ability to do the same thing with less labor. Historically, Black Corinth stock was probably kept for its pollen-producing abilities, so other female flowered varieties (with naturally higher yields) would set full crops.

The Black Corinth cultivar is also reputed to be very prone to powdery mildew, and is susceptible to numerous other diseases such as downy mildew and black rot.

Greece is still the primary producer of Zante currants, amounting to about 80% of total world production, with California, South Africa and Australia sharing most of the remainder.

== Culinary use ==
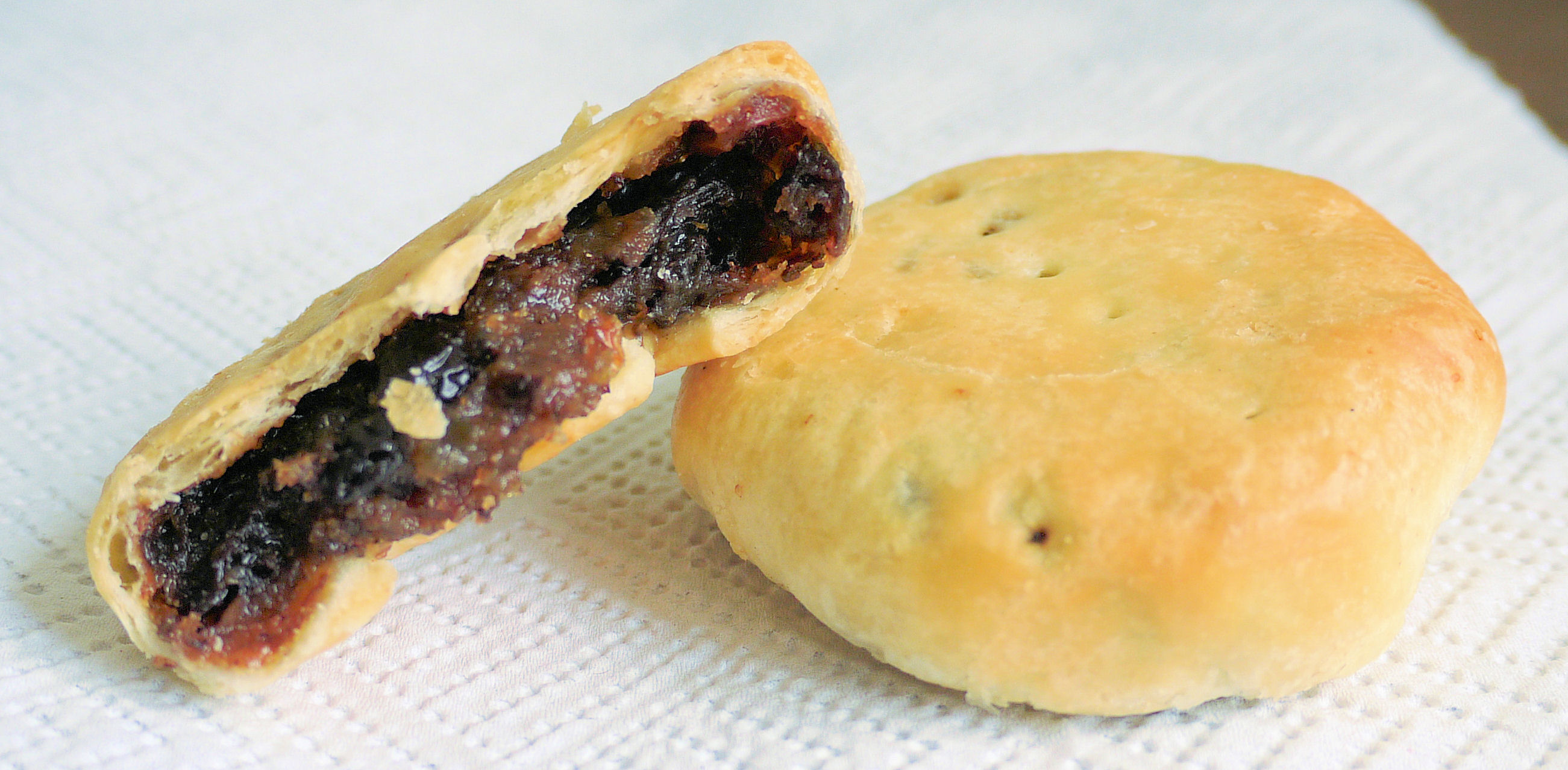
Eccles cakes

Zante currants are usually called simply "currants" and in many anglophone countries are used in traditional baked goods and puddings.

They have been a key ingredient of British cuisine for centuries, having been imported from the Mediterranean as sweet luxury goods long before cane sugar became widely available in the eighteenth and nineteenth centuries. Alongside raisins and sultanas they feature heavily in a wide variety of traditional baked goods recipes, including fruitcake, currant buns, teacakes, Eccles cakes, Saffron cake, bread and butter pudding, spotted dick, Welsh cakes, Bara brith, Christmas pudding and mince pies. They are also a major ingredient of currant slice (or currant square) and currant cake.

Unlike blackcurrants, Zante currants are not a significant source of vitamin C. The fresh fruit Zante raisins are made from is very small and sweet, with quite an intense flavour for a grape. Black, White and Red Corinth are often marketed under the name "Champagne grapes" in U.S. specialty stores, but they are not used for making Champagne.

== Toxicity ==
Along with grapes and raisins, Zante currants are nephrotoxic to dogs. This toxicity manifests as kidney failure and can be seen in relatively small doses.

== See also ==
- Sultana (grape)
- Raisin
