= Lykoporia =

Lykoporia Λυκοποριά
- Community
- Location within Greece
- Coordinates: 38°07′42″N 22°30′24″E
- Country: Greece
- Administrative region: Peloponnese
- Regional unit: Corinthia
- Municipality: Xylokastro-Evrostina
- Municipal unit: Evrostina
- Elevation: 10 m (33 ft)

Population (2021)
  - Community: 612
- Time zone: UTC+2 (EET)
  - Summer (DST): UTC+3 (EEST)
- Postal code: 20009
- Area code: (+30) 27430

Lykoporia (Greek: Λυκοποριά) is a village and a community in the municipality of Xylokastro-Evrostina, in south-central Greece. It is situated about 50 km from Corinth, and 75 km from Patras. The A8 motorway (Athens–Patras) passes south of the village. It is served by Lykoporia railway station on the line from Aigio to Kiato.

Lykoporia has a lighthouse with light characteristic "FL(2) 16s 10M" (white flashing light with a period of 16 seconds and a range of 10 miles).
