= Thalero =

Village in Corinthia, Greece

Thalero Θαλερό
- Community
- Location within Greece
- Coordinates: 38°02′13″N 22°39′47″E
- Country: Greece
- Administrative region: Peloponnese
- Regional unit: Corinthia
- Municipality: Xylokastro-Evrostina
- Municipal unit: Xylokastro

Population (2021)
  - Community: 133
- Time zone: UTC+2 (EET)
  - Summer (DST): UTC+3 (EEST)

Thalero (Greek: Θαλερό) is a village in Corinthia, Greece. It is located 2 kilometers from the Gulf of Corinth, close to the city of Xylokastro. Its original name was Tholero, the water, but it was changed to Thalero, originating from the ancient Greek word “thalos”, which means blooming. Poet Angelos Sikelianos spent his vacations there and wrote a poem has the name of the village. Its population is around 200 people and the hospitality of its people is famous to all of Corinthia.
