= Xylokastro railway station =

Railway station in Corinthia, Greece

Ξυλόκαστρο Xylokastro
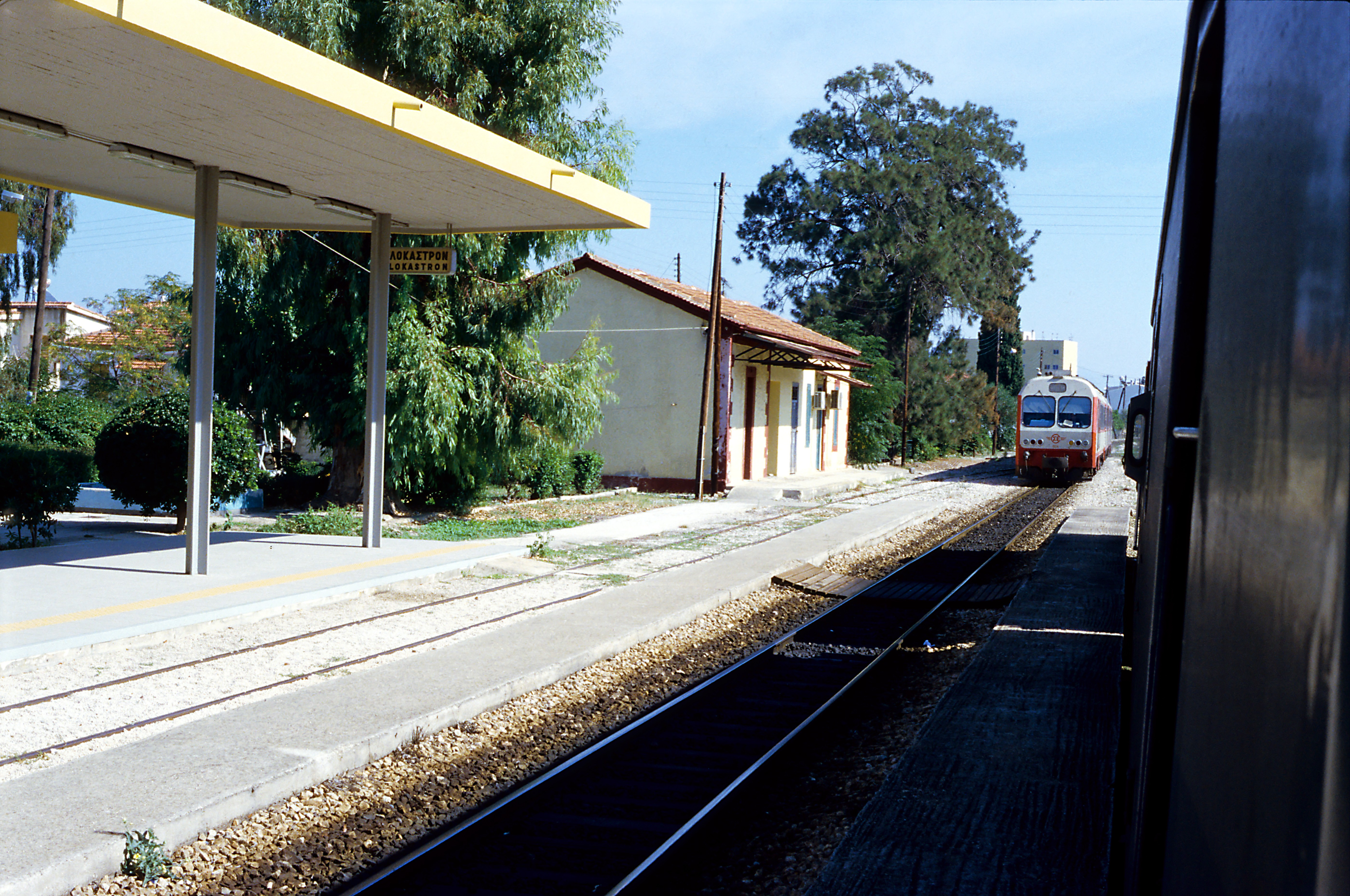

General information
- Location: Xylokastro, 204 00, Corinthia; Greece
- Coordinates: 38°04′36″N 22°36′34″E
- Owner: GAIAOSE
- Operator: Hellenic Train
- Line: Airport–Patras railway
- Platforms: 4 (2 bay platforms)
- Tracks: 6

Construction
- Structure type: at-grade
- Platform levels: 1
- Parking: Yes
- Cycle facilities: No

Other information
- Status: Unstaffed (Early 2021)
- Website: http://www.ose.gr/en/

Key dates
- 22 June 2020: Opened

Services
| Preceding station | Hellenic Train | Following station |
|---|---|---|
| Lykoporia towards Aigio | G7 Kiato-Aigio | Diminio towards Kiato |
Location

Xylokastro railway station (Greek: Σιδηροδρομικός σταθμός Ξυλόκαστρο, romanized: Sidirodromikós Stathmós Xylokastro) is a station in Xylokastro, a seaside town in Corinthia, Greece. It is located just south of Xylokastro, close to the Olimpia Odos motorway. It was opened on 22 June 2020 as part of the €848-million ERGOSE project extension of the Athens Airport–Patras railway to Aigio rail line, co-financed by the European Union's Cohesion Fund 2000–2006. The station is served by Hellenic Train local services between Kiato and Aigio. It should not be confused with the now-closed station on the old Piraeus–Patras railway, which is located northeast of the current station, closer to the coast of the Corinthian Gulf.

== History ==
The Station opened 22 June 2020 by Minister of Transport, Kostas Karamanlis. as part of the €848-million ERGOSE project extension of the Athens Airport–Patras railway to Aigio railline co-financed by the European Union's Cohesion Fund 2000–2006. It was one of three new stations in (Xylokastro, Akrata, and Aegio) and six holts (Diminio, Lykoporia, Lygia, Platanos Beach, Diakopto, and Eliki) to come online when the section of track opened. It should not be confused with the now-closed station on the old Piraeus–Patras railway SPAP, which is located northeast of the current station, closer to the coast of the Corinthian Gulf. In 2022 it will become the terminal of the Athens Suburban Railway when the electrification of this section is completed.

The station is owned by GAIAOSE, which since 3 October 2001 owns most railway stations in Greece: the company was also in charge of rolling stock from December 2014 until October 2025, when Greek Railways (the owner of the Airport–Patras railway) took over that responsibility.

== Facilities ==
The raised station is accessed via stairs or a ramp. It has one side platform and one island platform, with station buildings located on platform 1, with access to the platform level via stairs or lifts. The Station buildings are equipped with a booking office (not yet operational) and toilets. At platform level, there are sheltered seating, an air-conditioned indoor passenger shelter (as of 2020 not open) and Dot-matrix display departure and arrival screens and timetable poster boards on both platforms. There is a large car park on-site, adjacent to the eastbound line. Currently, there is no local bus stop connecting the station.

== Services ==
Since 22 November 2025, the following services call at this station:

- Hellenic Train local service between Kiato and Aigio, with six trains per day in each direction: passengers have to change at Kiato for Athens Suburban Railway trains towards Athens and Piraeus.

In 2022 it will become the terminal of the Athens Suburban Railway when the electrification of this section is completed.

== Accidents and incidents ==
=== 2020 accident ===
On 20 August 2020, a train derailed close to Xylokastro station for reasons not immediately clear, There were no reports of any injuries resulting from the incident, the cause of which was to be the subject of an investigation.

== Station layout ==
| L Ground/Concourse | Customer service | Tickets/Exits |
| Level; Ε1 | Side platform, doors will open on the right |
| Level; Ε1 | Platform 1 | Hellenic Train to Aigio (Lykoporia) ← |
| Level; Ε1 | Through Lines | Lines |
| Level; Ε1 | Platform 2 | Hellenic Train to Kiato (Diminio) → |
| Level; Ε1 | Island platform, doors on the right/left |
| Level; Ε1 | Platform 3 | In non-regular use |

== See also ==
- Railway stations in Greece
- Hellenic Railways Organization
- Hellenic Train
- Proastiakos
