= Diminio railway station =

Railway station in Corinthia, Greece

Διμηνιό Diminio

General information
- Location: Diminio, 202 00; Corinthia; Greece
- Coordinates: 38.03553°N 22.71517°E
- Owner: GAIAOSE
- Operator: Hellenic Train
- Line: Airport–Patras railway
- Platforms: 2
- Tracks: 2

Construction
- Structure type: at-grade
- Platform levels: 1
- Parking: Yes
- Cycle facilities: No
- Accessible: Yes

Key dates
- 22 June 2020: Line opened
- 16 December 2023: Station opened

Services
Preceding station	Hellenic Train	Following station
Xylokastro towards Aigio	G7 Kiato-Aigio	Kiato Terminus
Location

Diminio railway station (Greek: Σιδηροδρομικός Σταθμός Διμηνιού) is a railway station serving the town of Diminio in Greece. The station is located on the Airport–Patras railway, although the station opened over three years after the line did: it is a replacement for the nearby Neo Diminio railway halt of the Piraeus–Patras railway, which closed in 2007. It is currently served by local Hellenic Train services between Kiato and Aigio.

== History ==
The current Diminio station is located near the Neo Diminio (Greek: Νέο Διμηνιό) railway halt of the Piraeus–Patras railway, which operated from 1885 to 2007. The Kiato–Aigio section of the replacement Airport–Patras railway, on which the current Diminio station is located, opened on 22 June 2020: the station itself opened later, on 16 December 2023.

The station is owned by GAIAOSE, which since 3 October 2001 owns most railway stations in Greece: the company was also in charge of rolling stock from December 2014 until October 2025, when Greek Railways (the owner of the Airport–Patras railway) took over that responsibility.

== Services ==
Since 22 November 2025, the following services call at this station:

- Hellenic Train local service between Kiato and Aigio, with six trains per day in each direction: passengers have to change at Kiato for Athens Suburban Railway trains towards Athens and Piraeus.
