= Archaies Kleones =

Archaies Kleones Αρχαίες Κλεωνές
- Community
- Location within Greece
- Coordinates: 37°49.3′N 22°45′E
- Country: Greece
- Administrative region: Peloponnese
- Regional unit: Corinthia
- Municipality: Nemea

Population (2021)
  - Community: 540
- Time zone: UTC+2 (EET)
  - Summer (DST): UTC+3 (EEST)

Archaies Kleones (Greek: Αρχαίες Κλεωνές, formerly known as Condostavlos or Kontostavlos (Κοντόσταυλος) until 1963) is a settlement in Corinthia, in the municipality of Nemea, with a population of 540 residents according to 2021 census. It is situated on a hillside, 15 km east of Nemea and 24 km (approx. 14 miles) southwest of Corinth.

== History ==
Archaies Kleones was named after the ancient town Cleonae (Ancient Greek: Κλεωναί). Cleonae was a city of ancient Argolis, situated on the road from Argos to Corinth. Cleonae was a small town, mainly known for the Nemean Games that took place in its territory. According to mythology, Heracles killed the brothers Eurytus and Cteatus near Cleonae.

== Wine region ==
Archaies Kleones settlement is located in the Peloponnese, in the region of Corinthia, approximately 20 kilometers northeast of Corinth. Today, the appellation of Nemea is the most important red wine AOC of southern Greece and arguably of all of Greece. In the region of Nemea, the indigenous Greek Agiorgitiko grape is used and produces wines famous for their deep red color with violet and blue hues, complex aroma and long, velvety palate.

== See also ==
- List of settlements in Corinthia
