= Panariti, Corinthia =

Panariti Παναρίτι
- Community
- Location within Greece
- Coordinates: 37°59′28″N 22°32′28″E
- Country: Greece
- Administrative region: Peloponnese
- Regional unit: Corinthia
- Municipality: Xylokastro-Evrostina
- Municipal unit: Xylokastro

Population (2021)
  - Community: 246
- Time zone: UTC+2 (EET)
  - Summer (DST): UTC+3 (EEST)

Panariti (Greek: Παναρίτι, romanized: Panaríti) is a village in the municipal unit of Xylokastro, in the north of the Corinthia region, Greece. According to the 2021 census, the village had 246 residents.

At the turn of the 20th century, the village was renowned for its Black Corinth grapes, which are dried into Zante currants. The currants from Panariti were introduced to California in 1901 by botanist David Fairchild, and are still grown in California, Arizona and Nevada.
