= Evrostina =

Evrostina Ευρωστίνα
- Municipal unit
- Location within the regional unit

- Location within Greece
- Coordinates: 38°4′N 22°24′E
- Country: Greece
- Administrative region: Peloponnese
- Regional unit: Corinthia
- Municipality: Xylokastro-Evrostina

Area
  - Municipal unit: 101.4 km^{2} (39.2 sq mi)

Population (2021)
  - Municipal unit: 3,468
  - Municipal unit density: 34.20/km^{2} (88.58/sq mi)
  - Community: 606
- Time zone: UTC+2 (EET)
  - Summer (DST): UTC+3 (EEST)
- Postal code: 200 09
- Area code: 27430
- Vehicle registration: ΚΡ

Evrostina (Greek: Ευρωστίνα) is a village and a former municipality in Corinthia, Peloponnese, Greece. Since the 2011 local government reform it is part of the municipality Xylokastro-Evrostina, of which it is a municipal unit. The municipal unit has an area of 101.415 km^{2}. The seat of administration of the former municipality was the town Derveni.

== Geography ==
Evrostina is a mountain village, situated at about 650 m elevation between the mountain Mavro oros (elevation 1757 m) to the south and the mountain Evrostina (elevation 1208 m) to the northwest. The most populous village of the municipal unit, Derveni, is 7 km to the north on the coast of the Gulf of Corinth. Evrostina is 20 km west of Xylokastro and 50 km west of Corinth.

== Subdivisions ==
The municipal unit Evrostina is subdivided into the following communities (constituent villages in brackets):

- Derveni (Derveni, Mavra Litharia, Petalou)
- Elliniko
- Evrostina (Evrostina, Ano Aigialos, Koumarias, Rozena)
- Kallithea (Kallithea, Skoupaiika)
- Lygia
- Lykoporia
- Pyrgos
- Sarantapicho (Sarantapicho, Sarantapichiotika)
- Stomio
- Chelydoreo (Chelydoreo, Mentourgianika)

== Historical population ==
Year	Community	Municipal unit
1981	1,347	-
1991	1,060	5,688
2001	1,084	5,882
2011	750	4,088
2021	606	3,468

== See also ==
- List of settlements in Corinthia
