= Timanthes of Cleonae =

5th-century BC Greek Olympic victor of the Pankration

Timanthes of Cleonae (Ancient Greek: Τιμάνθης) was an ancient victor of the Pankration from Cleonae. A statue of him was created by Myron.

Ancient sources wrote that when he retired from athletics he continued to test his strength by drawing a great bow every day. His practice with the bow was interrupted during a period when he was away from home. When he returned, he was no longer able to bend the bow. Because of that he lit a fire and threw himself alive into it. Pausanias wrote that according to him this should be regarded as an act of madness rather than of courage. Suda also wrote what Pausanias believed.
