= Xylokastro =

Town in Corinthia, Greece

Xylokastro Ξυλόκαστρο
- Municipal unit
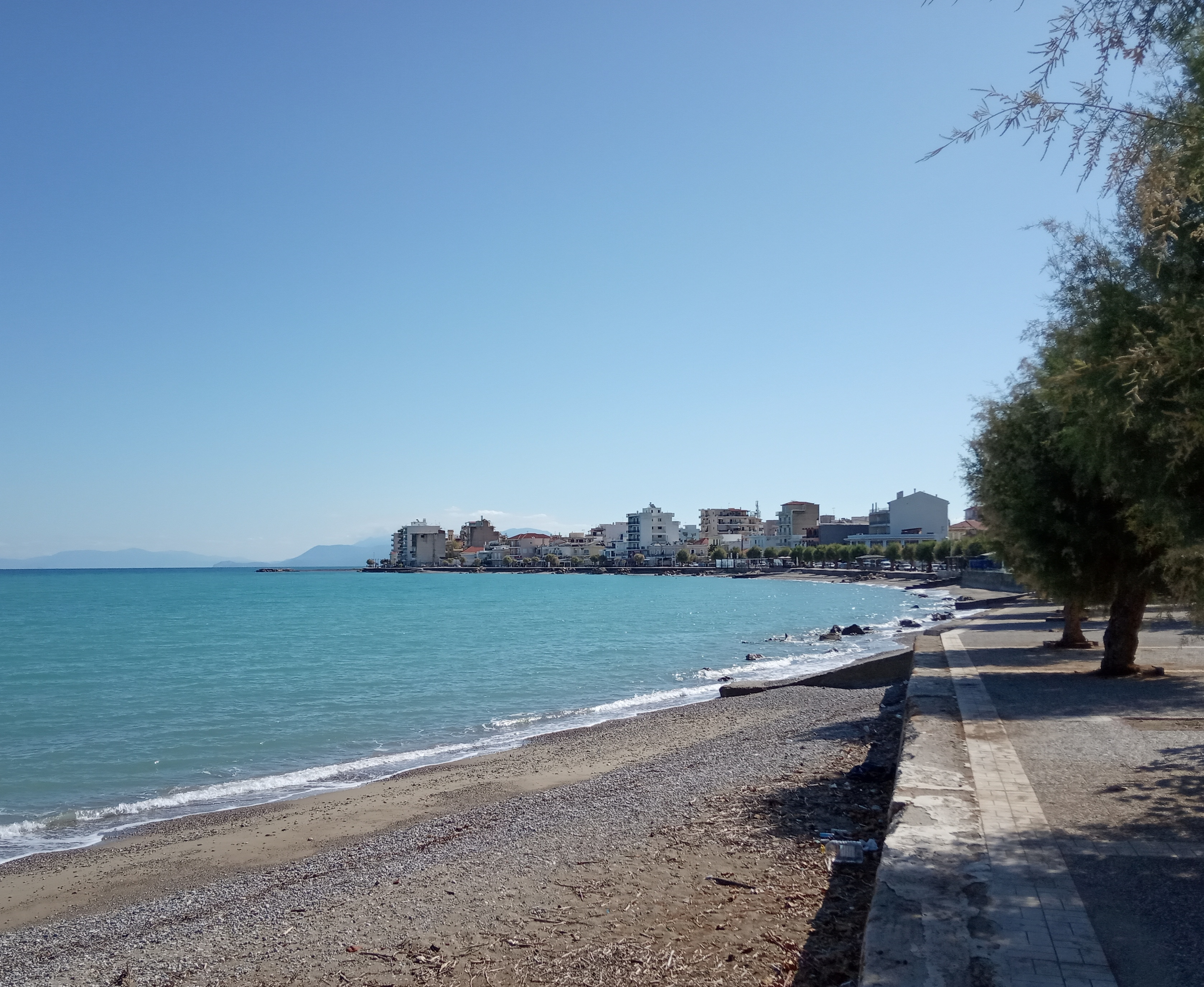
- Partial view of Xylokastro beach (October 2019)

- Location within the regional unit

- Location within Greece
- Coordinates: 38°4′N 22°38′E
- Country: Greece
- Administrative region: Peloponnese
- Regional unit: Corinthia
- Municipality: Xylokastro-Evrostina

Area
  - Municipal unit: 310.3 km^{2} (119.8 sq mi)
- Elevation: 3 m (9.8 ft)

Population (2021)
  - Municipal unit: 12,102
  - Municipal unit density: 39.00/km^{2} (101.0/sq mi)
  - Community: 5,601
- Time zone: UTC+2 (EET)
  - Summer (DST): UTC+3 (EEST)
- Postal code: 204 00
- Area code: 27430
- Vehicle registration: ΚΡ
- Website: http://www.xylokastro-evrostini.gov.gr/

Xylokastro (Greek: Ξυλόκαστρο) is a seaside town and a former municipality in Corinthia in the Peloponnese, Greece. Since the 2011 local government reform it is part of the municipality Xylokastro-Evrostina, of which it is a unit or component. The municipal unit has an area of 310.252 km^{2}.

Geographic features include a long 2 km white pebbled beach and semi-arid forest on varied terrain, scattered with early churches and evidence of early settlements and religious sites. It has narrowly separated upper and lower coastal roads and forms a medium-sized touristic village on the Gulf of Corinth. It is a popular coastal weekend location for many people of Athens.

== Subdivisions ==
The municipal unit Xylokastro is subdivided into the following communities (constituent villages in brackets):

- Ano Trikala (Ano Trikala, Zireia)
- Dendro
- Geliniatika (Geliniatika, Spartinaaika)
- Kamari (Kamari, Kariotika)
- Karya (Karya, Kariotika)
- Kato Loutro (Kato Loutro, Ano Loutro)
- Kato Synoikia Trikalon
- Korfiotissa
- Lagkadaiika (Lagkadaiika, Amfithea)
- Manna
- Melissi
- Mesi Synoikia Trikalon
- Nees Vrysoules
- Panariti
- Pellini
- Pitsa (Ano Pitsa, Kato Pitsa)
- Rethi
- Riza (Riza, Valtos, Georgantaiika, Sigeritsa, Chartsianika)
- Sofiana
- Stylia
- Sykia
- Thalero
- Throfari
- Xanthochori
- Xylokastro (Xylokastro, Mertikaiika)
- Zemeno

== Population ==
Year	Town population	Municipality population
1700	65	-
1981	5,188	-
1991	5,821	16,802
2001	5,618	15,273
2011	5,715	13,277
2021	5,601	12,102

== Geography ==
Xylokastro is situated on the coast of the Gulf of Corinth, 30 km northwest of Corinth , near the mouth of the river Trikalitikos. Apart from the narrow strip of land along the coast, where the town Xylokastro lies, the municipal unit is mountainous. The A8 motorway and EO8 road passes through both the town and municipality. The Xylokastro railway station is served by trains between Kiato and Aigio.

== History ==
The town took its name from a wooden castle (Greek: ξύλινο κάστρο), probably built in the 13th century. It was also known as Solo Castro. The village Stylia was known as Viladusa by the Venetians in the 18th century. It grew in size after the 1923 population exchange between Greece and Turkey, when Greek refugees from the region around the city of Nicomedia (known in Turkish as İzmit) in Anatolia settled there.

== People ==
- Vlassis Bonatsos (1949–2004), Greek actor
- Panagis Tsaldaris (1868–1936), former prime minister
- Sotirios Krokidas (1852–1924), former prime minister

== See also ==
- List of settlements in Corinthia
