= Titani =

Titani Τιτάνη
- Community
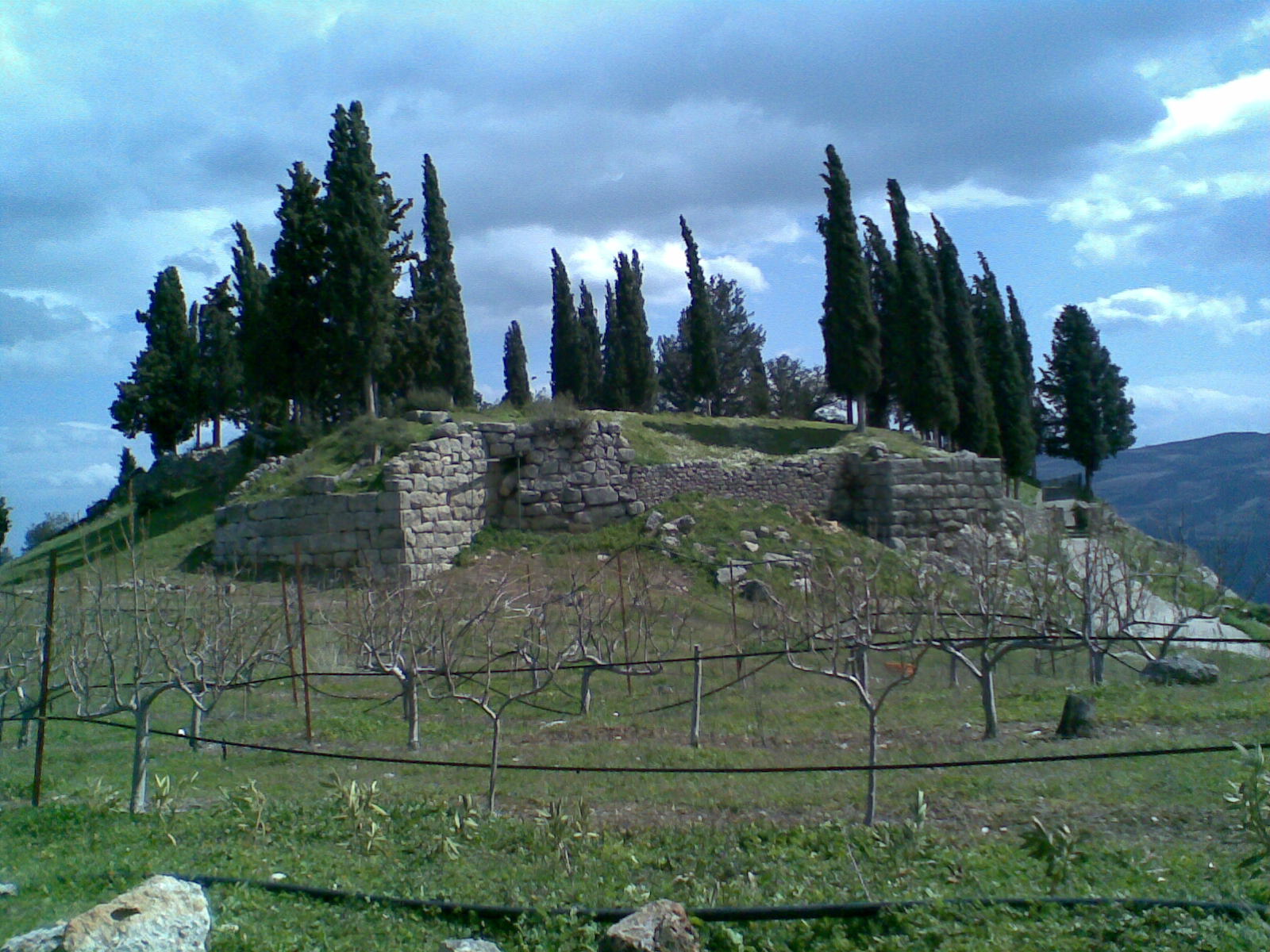
- The Acropolis of Titane

- Location within Greece
- Coordinates: 37°55.2′N 22°37.3′E
- Country: Greece
- Administrative region: Peloponnese
- Regional unit: Corinthia
- Municipality: Sikyona
- Municipal unit: Sikyona

Population (2021)
  - Community: 140
- Time zone: UTC+2 (EET)
  - Summer (DST): UTC+3 (EEST)
- Vehicle registration: ΚΡ

Titani (Greek: Τιτάνη, Titáni; before 1927: Voivonta (Βοϊβοντά, Voïvontá), from the Slavic title "voivode") is a village in the municipality of Sikyona, Corinthia, Greece. It is situated at the foot of the mountain Vesizas, above the left bank of the river Asopos, at 580 m elevation. The ancient city Titane was situated near the present village. It is 1 km northeast of Bozikas, 15 km southwest of Kiato and 27 km west of Corinth.

== Population ==
Year	Population
1981	249
1991	216
2001	310
2011	216
2021	140

== History ==
Ancient Titane was part of the city-state of Sicyon. It is named after Titan, a brother of Helios. The city had a temple of Asclepius, built by Alexanor, a grandson of Asclepius. There were also a temple of Athena, and an altar of the Winds. The acropolis of the ancient city has been excavated.

== See also ==
- List of settlements in Corinthia
