= Derveni, Corinthia =

Derveni Δερβένι
- Community
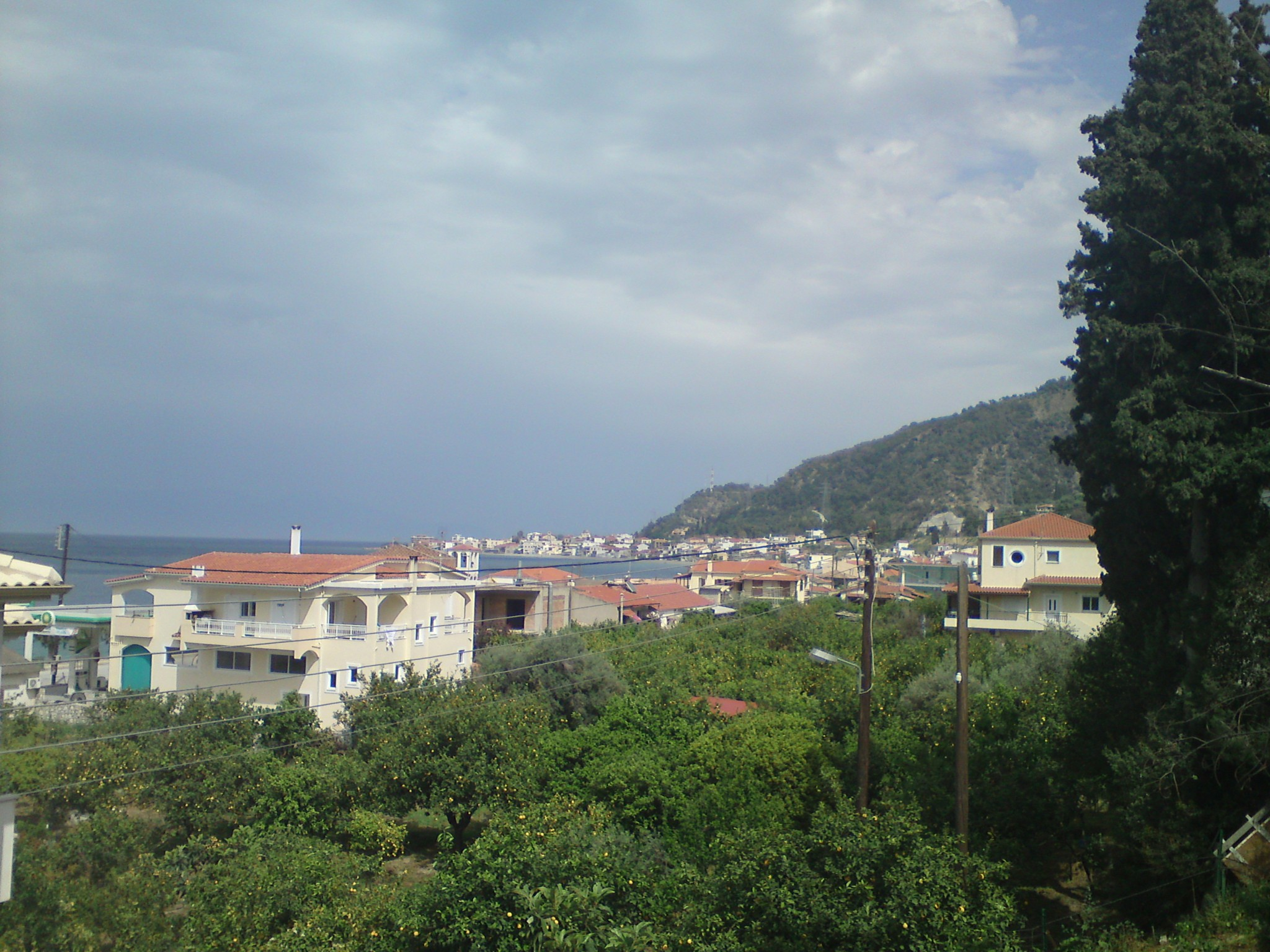
- Eastern view of Derveni

- Location within Greece
- Coordinates: 38°8′N 22°25′E
- Country: Greece
- Administrative region: Peloponnese
- Regional unit: Corinthia
- Municipality: Xylokastro-Evrostina
- Municipal unit: Evrostina

Population (2021)
  - Community: 941
- Time zone: UTC+2 (EET)
  - Summer (DST): UTC+3 (EEST)
- Postal code: 200 09

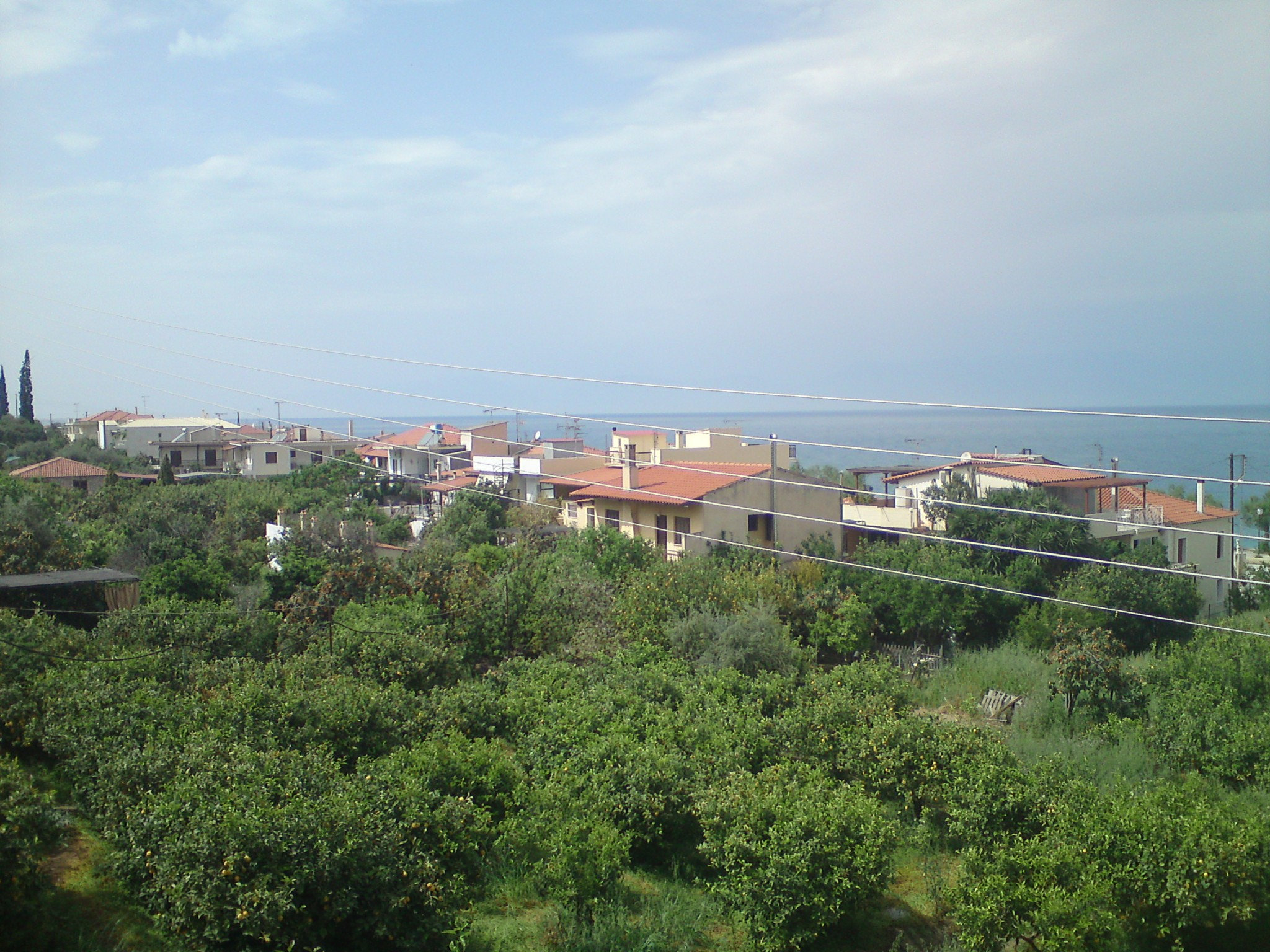
Western view of Derveni

Derveni (Greek: Δερβένι) is a coastal town in Corinthia in the Peloponnese peninsula, Greece. It was the seat of the former municipality Evrostina.

Its population stands at 941 (2021 census) but rises dramatically during the holiday season and many of the houses and flats are second residencies to people living mostly in Athens (142 km) or Patras (73 km). Its nearest main town is Corinth (50 km). One of its main characteristics is that its coastal houses and flats are flanked by the old national road to the south and give directly onto the pebbled sea shore to the north. Due to its restricted parking facilities and the infrequent train service, it is not a stop-over town for passing traffic, or amenable to day trips.

Its name derives from its geographical location, squeezed between the mountains and the deep Corinthian Sea. Derven means narrow passage or path in Ottoman Turkish. It was founded in the early 19th century by inhabitants of the nearby village of Zacholi who exported and processed raisins. Its trading apogee came between 1923–1940 when hundreds of workers processed the so-called Corinth raisins that arrived by boat on its small port. The port no longer exists. The northern coastline of the Peloponnese has been afflicted by erosion and sea level rise for many years. More specifically, in the region of Derveni, Corinthia, on 29 February 2012, generalised erosion of the coastal zone was observed on account of seabed subsidence (up to 30 m) along the coastline, destroying dozens of houses and business premises.

It is linked by rail to Athens and Patras.

== Notable people ==
- Miltos Manetas, Painter and Internet artist, Founder of the InternetPavilion
