= Alexanor =

Ancient Greek mythological figure

In Greek mythology, Alexanor (Ancient Greek: Ἀλεξάνωρ) a son of Machaon, and grandson of the Greek god Asclepius.

== Mythology ==
Alexanor was worshipped as a hero in Titane of Sicyonia, where he established an Asclepieion temple built to his grandfather within a grove densely planted with cypresses. He also built a temple on the summit of Titane in the territory of Sicyon to honor his grandfather, around which there were dwellings for the use of those who came to solicit the aid of the god. Inside this Asclepieion, there were wooden statues (xoana) of Asclepius and Hygeia. Many believed that the statue of Asclepius was the work of Alexanor himself. In his honor, there was also his own statue inside the building.

Alexanor's brothers were Sphyros, who also founded an Asclepieion in Argos, Polemocrates, Alcon, and others that remain unknown. Alexanor had great respect for his grandfather and was proud of his heritage so proud he built a temple in his honor he himself would in up being worshiped there along with his grandfather, and sacrifices were offered to him, but only after sunset.
