= Bozikas =

Bozikas Μποζικάς
- Community
- Location within Greece
- Coordinates: 37°54.9′N 22°36.5′E
- Country: Greece
- Administrative region: Peloponnese
- Regional unit: Corinthia
- Municipality: Sikyona
- Municipal unit: Sikyona
- Elevation: 660 m (2,170 ft)

Population (2021)
  - Community: 189
- Time zone: UTC+2 (EET)
  - Summer (DST): UTC+3 (EEST)
- Vehicle registration: ΚΡ

Bozikas (Greek: Μποζικάς) is a village in the municipality of Sikyona, Corinthia, Greece. It is 12 kilometers (7.5 mi) north of Nemea and 16 kilometers (9.9 mi) southwest of Kiato. The village has about 200 inhabitants and is located at an elevation of 660 meters (2,170 ft). The red wine Agiorgitiko is grown in the region. Olive oil is also produced in Bozikas.

The climate is Mediterranean. The average temperature is 17 °C. The hottest month is August, at 28 °C, and the coldest is January, at 6 °C. The average rainfall is 791 mm per year. The wettest month is December, at 167 mm of rain, and the driest is July, at 7 mm. </references>
