= Diminio, Corinthia =

Village in Peloponnese, Greece

Diminio Διμηνιό
- Community
- Location within Greece
- Coordinates: 38°01′52″N 22°42′40″E
- Country: Greece
- Administrative region: Peloponnese
- Regional unit: Corinthia
- Municipality: Sikyona
- Municipal unit: Sikyona

Population (2021)
  - Community: 523
- Time zone: UTC+2 (EET)
  - Summer (DST): UTC+3 (EEST)

Diminio (Greek: Διμηνιό) is a village in the municipality Sikyona, Corinthia, Greece. It is situated near the coast of the Gulf of Corinth.

== Transport ==
Diminio railway station is open since 16 December 2023, and is served by the Kiato–Aigio local train operated by Hellenic Train: passengers have to change at Kiato for trains to Athens.
