= Archaia Nemea =

Archaia Nemea Archaia Nemea
- Community
- Location within Greece
- Coordinates: 37°48′22″N 22°42′18″E
- Country: Greece
- Administrative region: Peloponnese
- Regional unit: Corinthia
- Municipality: Nemea

Population (2021)
  - Community: 428
- Time zone: UTC+2 (EET)
  - Summer (DST): UTC+3 (EEST)

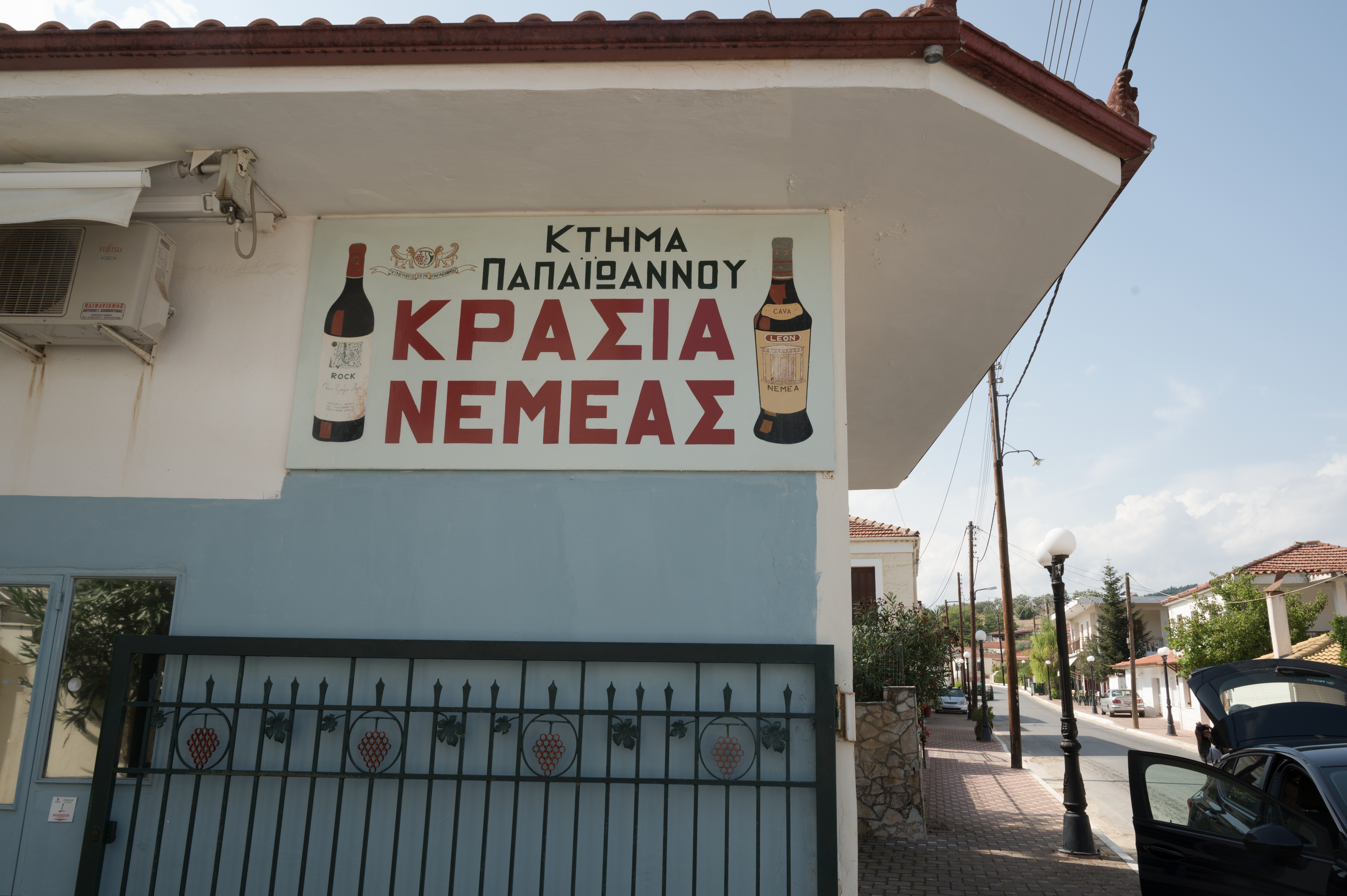
winery in Archaia Nemea

Archaia Nemea (Greek: Αρχαία Νεμέα, "Ancient Nemea", before 1958: Ηράκλειον - Irakleion) is a village about 27 km southwest of Corinth in Greece named after the nearby ruins of the ancient site of Nemea. The old name of this place was Iraklion. At the 2021 census, it had 428 inhabitants.

There is an ancient Sanctuary of Zeus nearby and very early Neolithic skeletal remains have been discovered in the region.

"The Sanctuary of Zeus and the site of Tsoungiza (as well as the modern and 19th century villages of Archaia Nemea and Koutsomodi, respectively) are located at the head or southern end of the small Nemea Valley through which flows a small river. This end of the valley is enclosed by a ring of low hills which form a water catchment that supplies the river. The hills continue to the north flanking the valley on either side. Less than two kilometers from the head of the valley it narrows, and the river cuts deeply into the valley floor and runs down to the Corinthian Gulf."
