= Soulinari =

Soulinari Σουληνάρι
- Community
- Interactive map of Soulinari
- Country: Greece
- Administrative region: Peloponnese
- Regional unit: Messenia
- Municipality: Pylos-Nestoras
- Municipal unit: Chiliochoria

Population (2021)
  - Community: 322
- Time zone: UTC+2 (EET)
  - Summer (DST): UTC+3 (EEST)

Soulinari (Greek: Σουληνάρι) is a village in the Greek regional unit of Messenia. It belongs to the municipality of Pylos-Nestoras.
