= Titane (Sicyon) =

Coordinates: 37°55′14″N 22°37′30″E

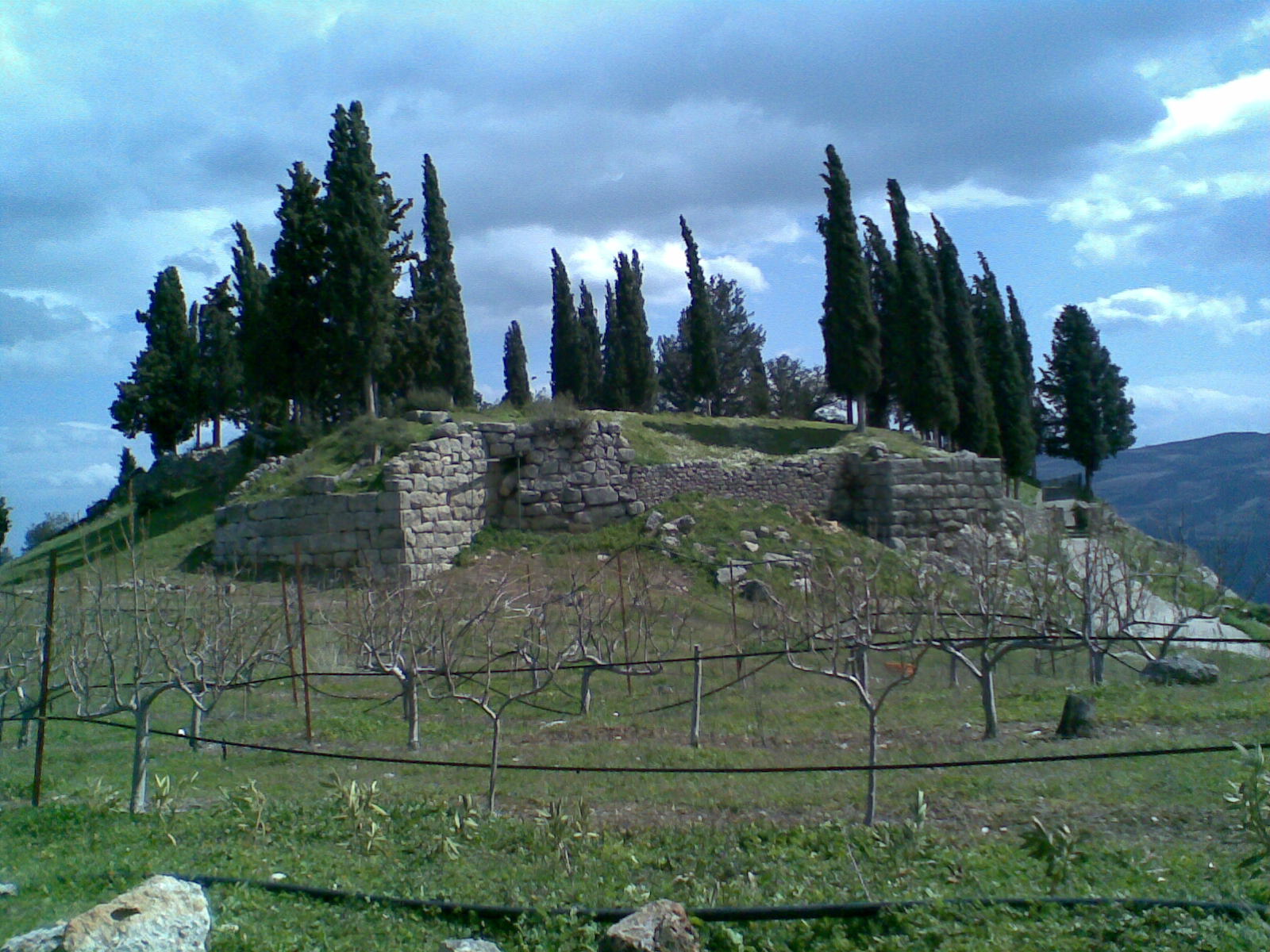
Acropolis of Titane

Titane (Ancient Greek: Τιτάνη) or Titana (Τίτανα) was a town in the Sicyonia, upon the left bank of the Asopus, distant 60 stadia from Sicyon, and 40 from Phlius. It was situated upon the summit of a hill, where Titan, the brother of Helios the Sun (and usually simply identified with Helios himself), is said to have dwelt, and to have given his name to the spot. It was celebrated for a temple of Asclepius, reported to have been built by Alexander, the son of Machaon, the son of Asclepius. This temple still existed in the time of Pausanias (2nd century), in the middle of a grove of cypress trees, in which the servants of the god attended to the patients who came thither for the recovery of their health. Within the temple stood statues of Asclepius and Hygieia, and of the heroes Alexanor and Euamerion. There was also a temple of Athena at Titane, situated upon a hill, and containing an ancient wooden statue of the goddess. In descending from the hill there was an altar of the Winds.

Its site is located near the modern village of Titani.
