= Kryoneri, Thessaloniki =

Kryoneri Κρυονέρι
- Community
- Location within Greece
- Coordinates: 40°48.9′N 23°16.9′E
- Country: Greece
- Administrative region: Central Macedonia
- Regional unit: Thessaloniki
- Municipality: Lagkadas
- Municipal unit: Sochos

Area
  - Community: 58.655 km^{2} (22.647 sq mi)
- Elevation: 620 m (2,030 ft)

Population (2021)
  - Community: 994
  - Density: 16.9/km^{2} (43.9/sq mi)
- Time zone: UTC+2 (EET)
  - Summer (DST): UTC+3 (EEST)
- Postal code: 570 02
- Area code: +30-2395
- Vehicle registration: NA to NX

Kryoneri (Greek: Κρυονέρι) is a village and a community of the Lagkadas municipality. Before the 2011 local government reform it was part of the municipality of Sochos, of which it was a municipal district. The 2021 census recorded 994 inhabitants in the community. The community of Kryoneri covers an area of 58.655 km^{2}.

== Administrative division ==
The community of Kryoneri consists of two separate settlements:

- Avgi (population 267 in 2021)
- Kryoneri (population 727)

== See also ==
- List of settlements in the Thessaloniki regional unit
