= Pellini =

Pellini is an Italian surname. Notable people with the surname include:

- Bo Pellini (born 1967), former American football coach and former player
- Chris Pellini (born 1984), Canadian sprint kayaker
- Elisabetta Pellini (born 1974), Italian actress and model
- Giorgio Pellini (1923–1986), Italian fencer
- Marcantonio Pellini (1659–1760), Italian painter
- Stefano Pellini (born 1997), Italian professional footballer

== See also ==
- Pellene
- Pollini
