= Sykia, Corinthia =

Sykia Συκιά
- Community
- Location within Greece
- Coordinates: 38°03′52″N 22°39′26″E
- Country: Greece
- Administrative region: Peloponnese
- Regional unit: Corinthia
- Municipality: Xylokastro-Evrostina
- Municipal unit: Xylokastro

Population (2021)
  - Community: 557
- Time zone: UTC+2 (EET)
  - Summer (DST): UTC+3 (EEST)

Sykia (Greek: Συκιά, also Συκέα - Sykea) is a village and a community on the northern coast of the Peloponnese peninsula in southern Greece, belonging to the municipality of Xylokastro-Evrostina in Corinthia.
