= Sikyona =

Sikyona Σικυώνα
- Municipality
- Seal

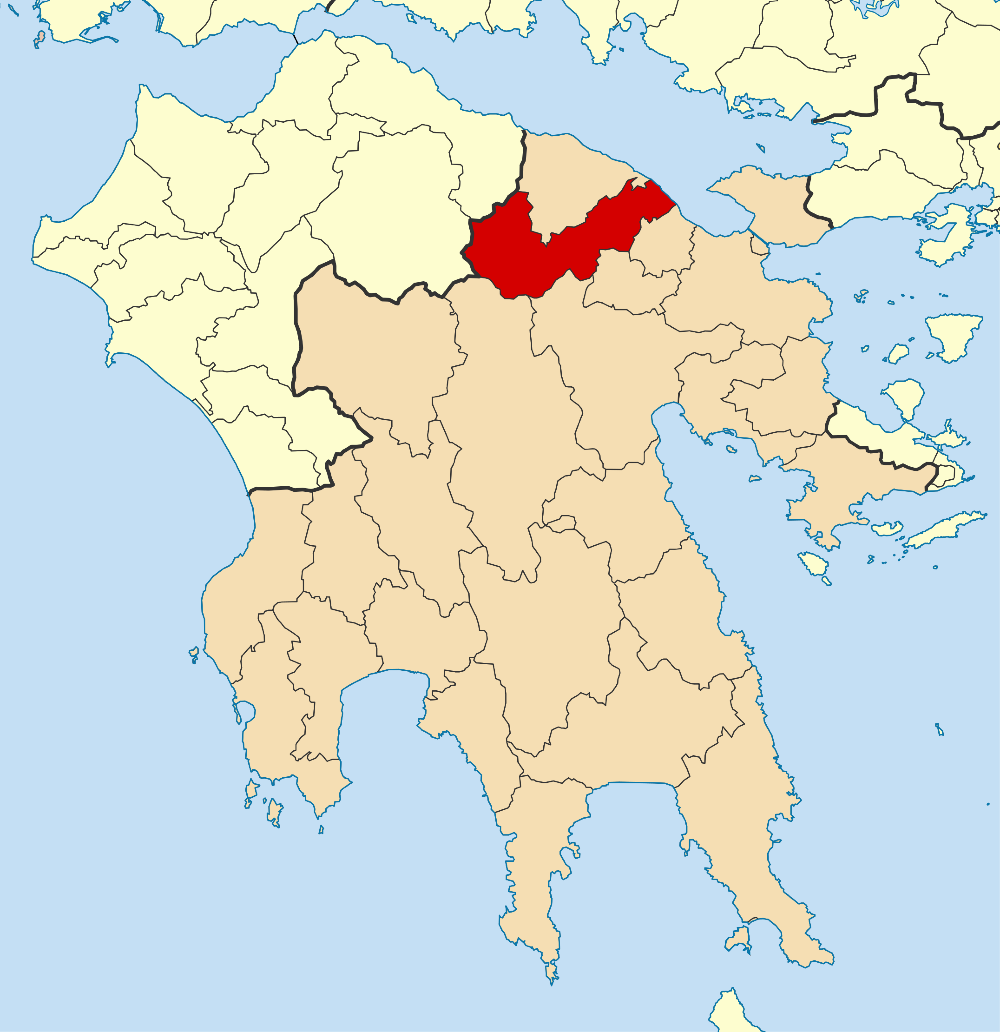

- Location within Greece
- Coordinates: 38°0′N 22°44′E
- Country: Greece
- Administrative region: Peloponnese
- Regional unit: Corinthia
- Seat: Kiato

Area
  - Municipality: 602.5 km^{2} (232.6 sq mi)
  - Municipal unit: 171.3 km^{2} (66.1 sq mi)
- Elevation: 5 m (16 ft)

Population (2021)
  - Municipality: 21,187
  - Density: 35.17/km^{2} (91.08/sq mi)
  - Municipal unit: 17,962
  - Municipal unit density: 104.9/km^{2} (271.6/sq mi)
- Time zone: UTC+2 (EET)
  - Summer (DST): UTC+3 (EEST)
- Postal code: 202 00
- Area code: 27420
- Vehicle registration: ΚΡ

Sikyona (Greek: Σικυώνα) is a municipality in Corinthia, Greece. The seat of the municipality is in Kiato. Sikyona takes its name from the ancient city Sicyon, which was located in the same territory.

== Municipality ==
The municipality Sikyona was formed at the 2011 local government reform by the merger of the following 3 former municipalities, that became municipal units:

- Feneos
- Sikyona
- Stymfalia

The municipality has an area of 602.539 km^{2}, the municipal unit 171.268 km^{2}. The municipal unit Sikyona is subdivided into the following communities:

- Archaia Sikyona-Vasiliko
- Bozikas
- Diminio
- Gonoussa
- Kato Diminio
- Sikyona (Kiato)
- Klimenti
- Kryoneri
- Laliotis
- Megas Valtos
- Mikros Valtos
- Moulki
- Paradeisi
- Pasi
- Souli
- Titani

== Historical population ==
Year	Municipal unit	Municipality
1991	18,316	-
2001	19,455	-
2011	19,025	22,794
2021	17,962	21,187
