= Cleonae (Argolis) =

Human settlement

Coordinates: 37°49′01″N 22°45′13″E

Cleonae or Kleonai (Ancient Greek: Κλεωναί) was a city in ancient Peloponnesus, described by writers of the Roman period as a city of Argolis, but never included in the Argeia or territory of Argos, in the flourishing period of Greek history. Cleonae was situated on the road from Argos to Corinth, at the distance of 120 stadia from the former city, and 80 stadia from the latter. There was a narrow pass through the mountains, called Tretus, leading from Argos to Cleonae. Cleonae stood in a small plain upon a river flowing into the Corinthian Gulf a little westward of Lechaeum. In its territory was Mount Apesas, now Mount Phoukas, connected with the Acrocorinthus by a rugged range of hills. Both Strabo and Pausanias describe Cleonae as a small place; and the former writer, who saw it from the Acrocorinthus, says that it is situated upon a hill surrounded on all sides by buildings, and well walled, so as to deserve the epithet given to it by Homer in the Catalogue of Ships in the Iliad – ἐϋκτιμένας Κλεωνάς ('well-built Cleonae'). Statius also speaks of "ingenti turritae mole Cleonae."

Cleonae possessed only a small territory. It derived its chief importance from the Nemean Games being celebrated in its territory, in the grove of Nemea, between Cleonae and Phlius. Hence the festival is called by Pindar ἀγὼν Κλεωναῖος ('the Cleonaean games') Heracles is said to have slain Eurytus and Cteatus, the sons of Actor, near Cleonae; and Diodorus mentions a temple of Heracles erected in the neighbourhood of the city in memory of that event. The ruins of this sanctuary, a Prostyle of Doric order, still exist.

Cleonae is said to have derived its name either from Cleones, the son of Pelops, or from Cleone, the daughter of the river-god Asopus. It was conquered by the Dorians, whereupon some of its inhabitants, together with those of the neighbouring town of Phlius, are said to have founded Clazomenae in Asia Minor. In the Dorian conquest, Cleonae formed part of the lot of Temenus, and in early times was one of the confederated allies or subordinates of Argos. Indeed in the historical period, Cleonae was for the most part closely connected with Argos. After the Greco-Persian Wars, the Cleonaeans assisted the Argives in subduing Mycenae; and they fought as the allies of Argos at the Battle of Mantinea (418 BCE). Of their subsequent history little is known, though their city is occasionally mentioned down to the time of Ptolemy.

Timanthes of Cleonae was a victor in the pankration.

The site of ancient Cleonae is located near modern Ag. Vasileios, near Archaies Kleones.

== See also ==
- List of ancient Greek cities
