= Kryoneri, Corinthia =

Village in the Peloponnese, Greece

Kryoneri Κρυονέρι
- Community
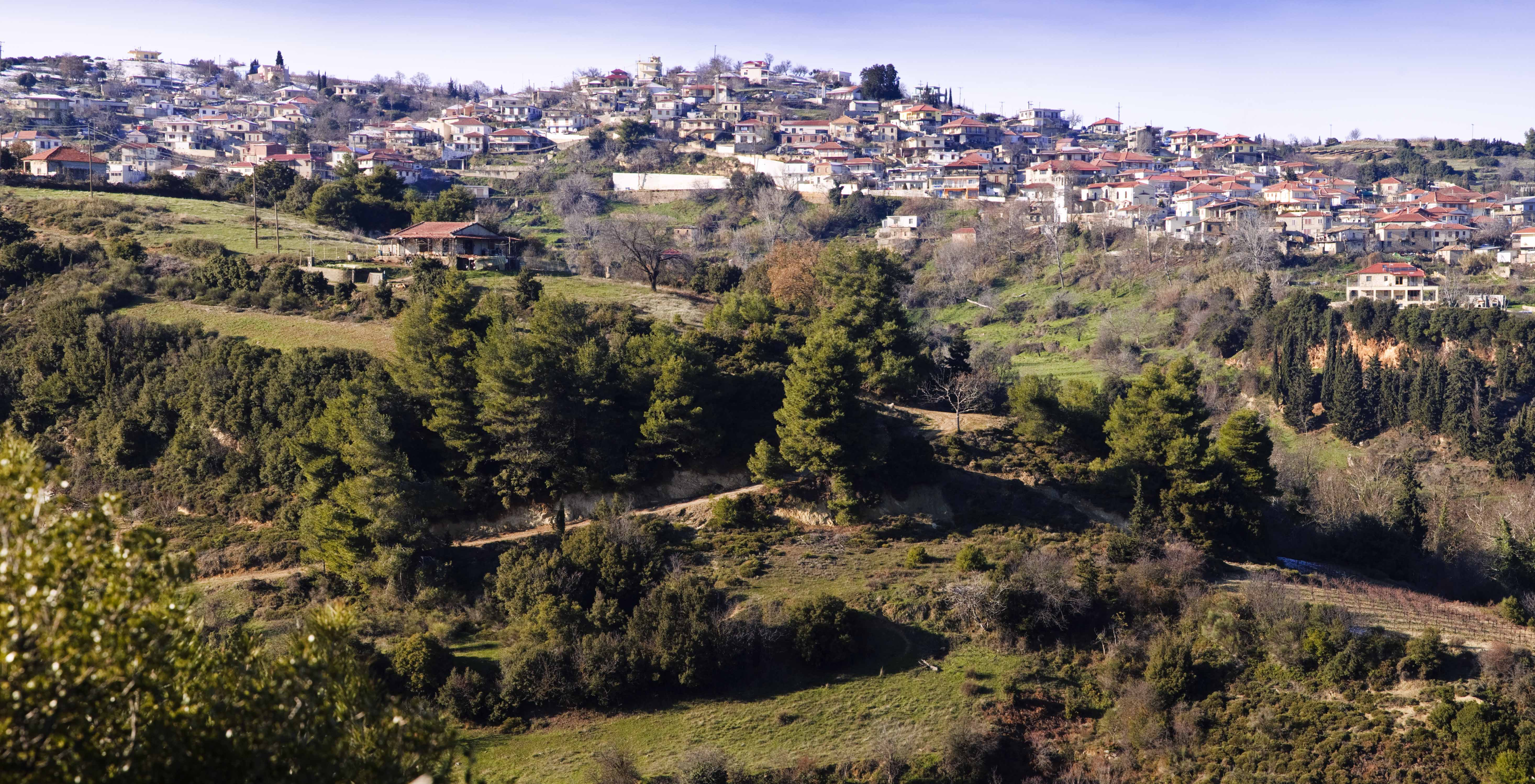
- Panoramic view of Kryoneri

- Location within Greece
- Coordinates: 37°52′N 22°35′E
- Country: Greece
- Administrative region: Peloponnese
- Regional unit: Corinthia
- Municipality: Sikyona
- Municipal unit: Sikyona
- Elevation: 740 m (2,430 ft)

Population (2021)
  - Community: 768
- Time zone: UTC+2 (EET)
  - Summer (DST): UTC+3 (EEST)
- Vehicle registration: ΚΡ

Kryoneri (Greek: Κρυονέρι, before 1955: Μάτζανη - Matzani) is a village in Corinthia regional unit, Greece. It is 42 km southwest of Corinth, built at 740 m height, in the slopes of Velisa mountain (part of Cyllene mountain). Kryoneri is part of the municipality of Sikyona. The village was flown through by a stream, tributary of Elisson River. Kryoneri has panoramic view towards northeast Corinthia until the coasts of Saronic and Corinthian Gulf.

== History ==
The first name of the settlement was Mergeni, which possibly means grass land. This name derived from the Franks who dominated the Peloponnese during the 13th and 14th centuries. The current name was given in 1954 which means a place with cold water. The village took part in the Greek War of Independence, where a chieftain from Kryoneri with the surname Stergiopoulos is mentioned.

== Historical population ==
Census	Population
2001	961
2011	868
2021	768

== Places of interest ==
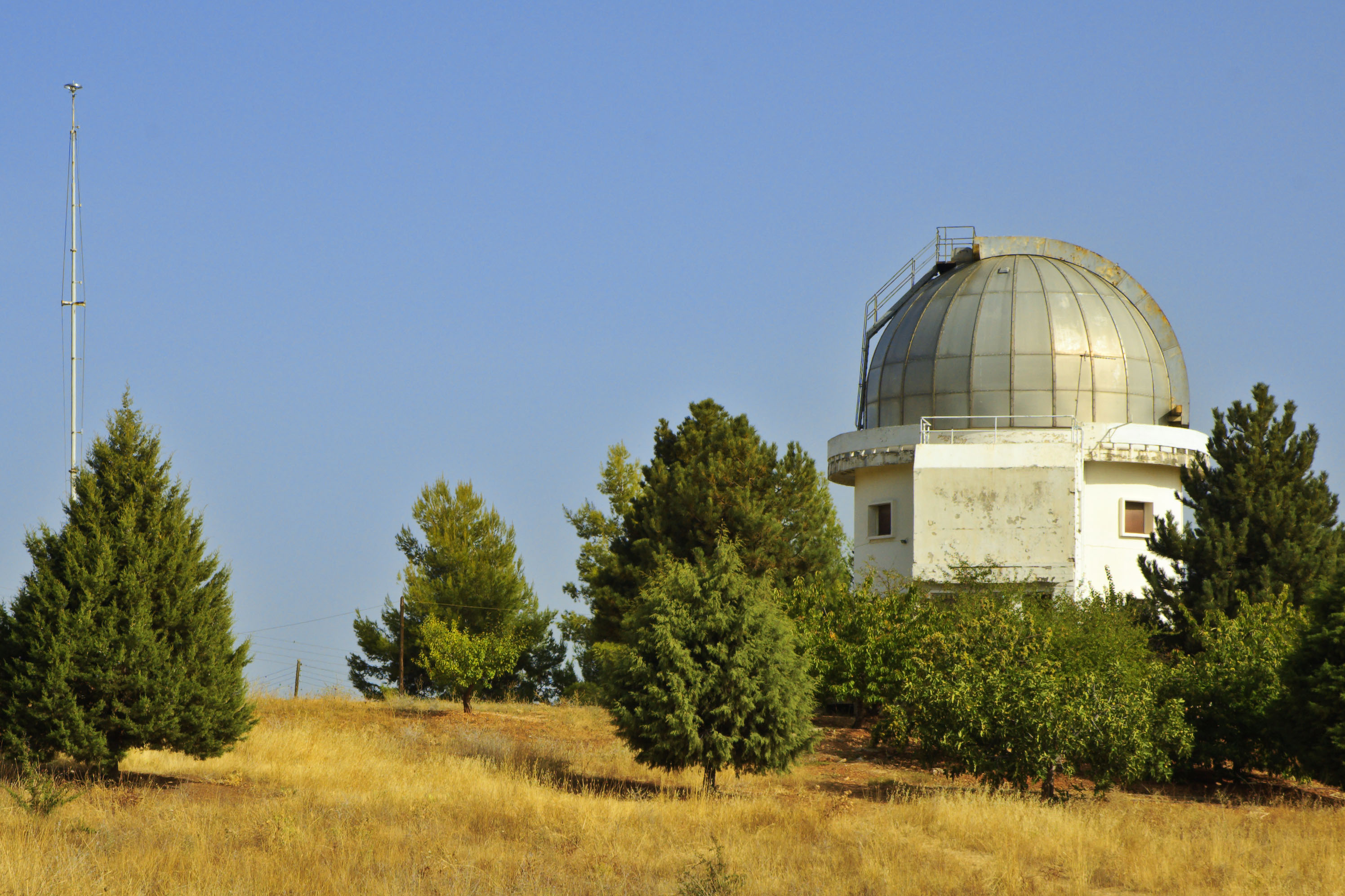
The observatory in Kryoneri

The Kryoneri Astronomical Station observatory was built in 1974–75 at a height of 1000 meters. It has the second biggest telescope in Greece after the Chelmos Observatory. Its catoptric lens is 122 cm diameter.

Located 4 km southwest of the village is the monastery of the Assumption of the Theotokos Lechova. It is built at 1050 m height. The catholicon of the monastery dates from Byzantine times, while other parts of the monastery belong to the 12th or 13th century.

Near the village there is a cemetery of the Mycenaean era. It includes ruins of 10 vaulted tombs. In the place Koutroumbi there are some ruins of a Mycenaean acropolis.
