= Sochos =

Sochos Σοχός
- Municipal unit
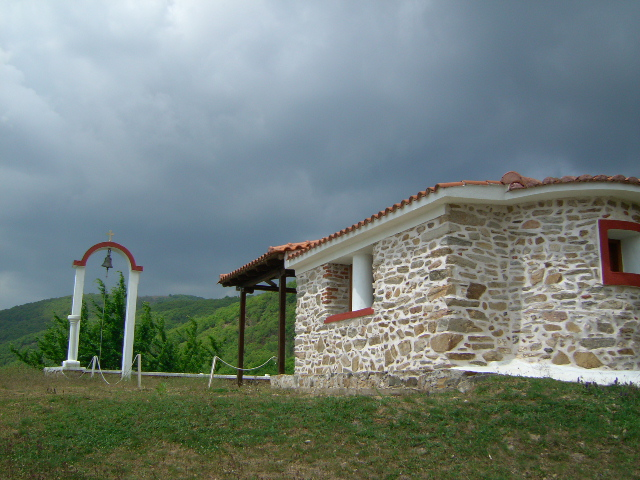
- Profitis Ilias Church in Sochos

- Location within the regional unit

- Location within Greece
- Coordinates: 40°49′N 23°22′E
- Country: Greece
- Administrative region: Central Macedonia
- Regional unit: Thessaloniki
- Municipality: Lagkadas

Area
  - Municipal unit: 281.518 km^{2} (108.695 sq mi)
  - Community: 153.042 km^{2} (59.090 sq mi)
- Elevation: 630 m (2,070 ft)

Population (2021)
  - Municipal unit: 3,987
  - Municipal unit density: 14.16/km^{2} (36.68/sq mi)
  - Community: 1,979
  - Community density: 12.93/km^{2} (33.49/sq mi)
- Time zone: UTC+2 (EET)
  - Summer (DST): UTC+3 (EEST)
- Postal code: 570 02
- Area code: +30-2395
- Vehicle registration: NA to NX

Sochos (Greek: Σοχός, [so'xos], Bulgarian: Сухо) is a community and a former municipality in the Thessaloniki regional unit, Greece. Since the 2011 local government reform it is part of the municipality Lagkadas, of which it is a municipal unit. The community of Sochos covers an area of 153.042 km^{2} while the respective municipal unit covers an area of 281.518 km^{2}.

== Geography ==
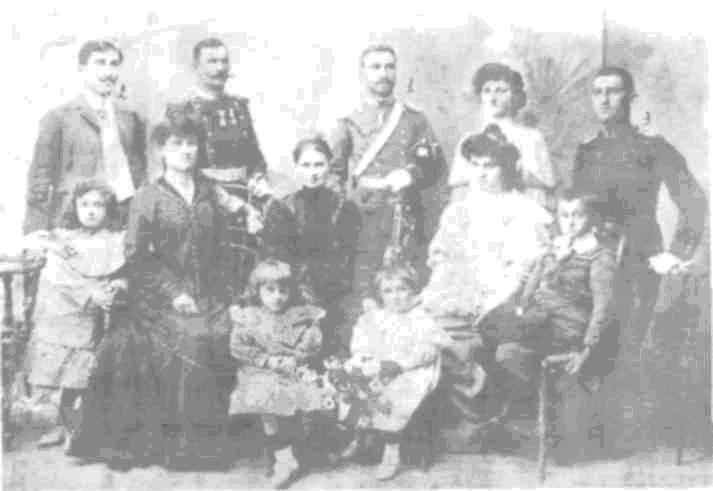
Photograph of the Dumbalakov family from Sochos (1907), a prominent family made up of teachers, journalists, officers, and IMRO revolutionaries

=== Location ===
Sochos lies on a plateau of an altitude of about 600m above sea level, that is 15 km north of Lake Volvi. The forest area of Vertiskos Mountain begins at the outskirts of the settlement.

=== Administrative division ===
The municipal unit Sochos is subdivided into the following communities:

- Sochos
- Kryoneri
- Askos

=== Population ===
The population of the community of Sochos was 1,979 people as of 2021. The population of the municipal unit was 3,987.
