= Nemea (town) =

Nemea Νεμέα
- Municipality
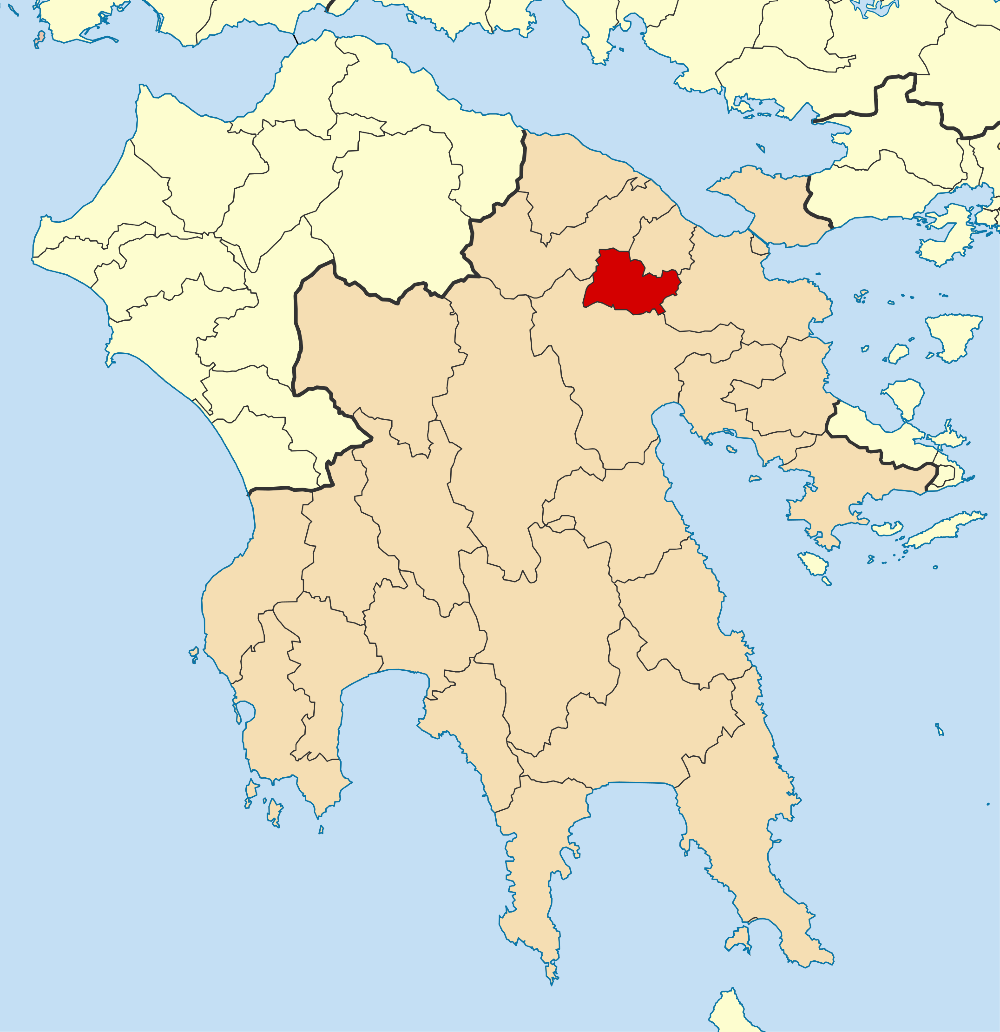

- Location within Greece
- Coordinates: 37°49′N 22°40′E
- Country: Greece
- Administrative region: Peloponnese
- Regional unit: Corinthia

Government
  - Mayor: Konstantinos Frousios (since 2019)

Area
  - Municipality: 204.7 km^{2} (79.0 sq mi)
- Elevation: 320 m (1,050 ft)

Population (2021)
  - Municipality: 5,713
  - Density: 27.91/km^{2} (72.28/sq mi)
  - Community: 3,505
- Time zone: UTC+2 (EET)
  - Summer (DST): UTC+3 (EEST)
- Postal code: 20500
- Area code: 27460
- Website: www.nemea.gr

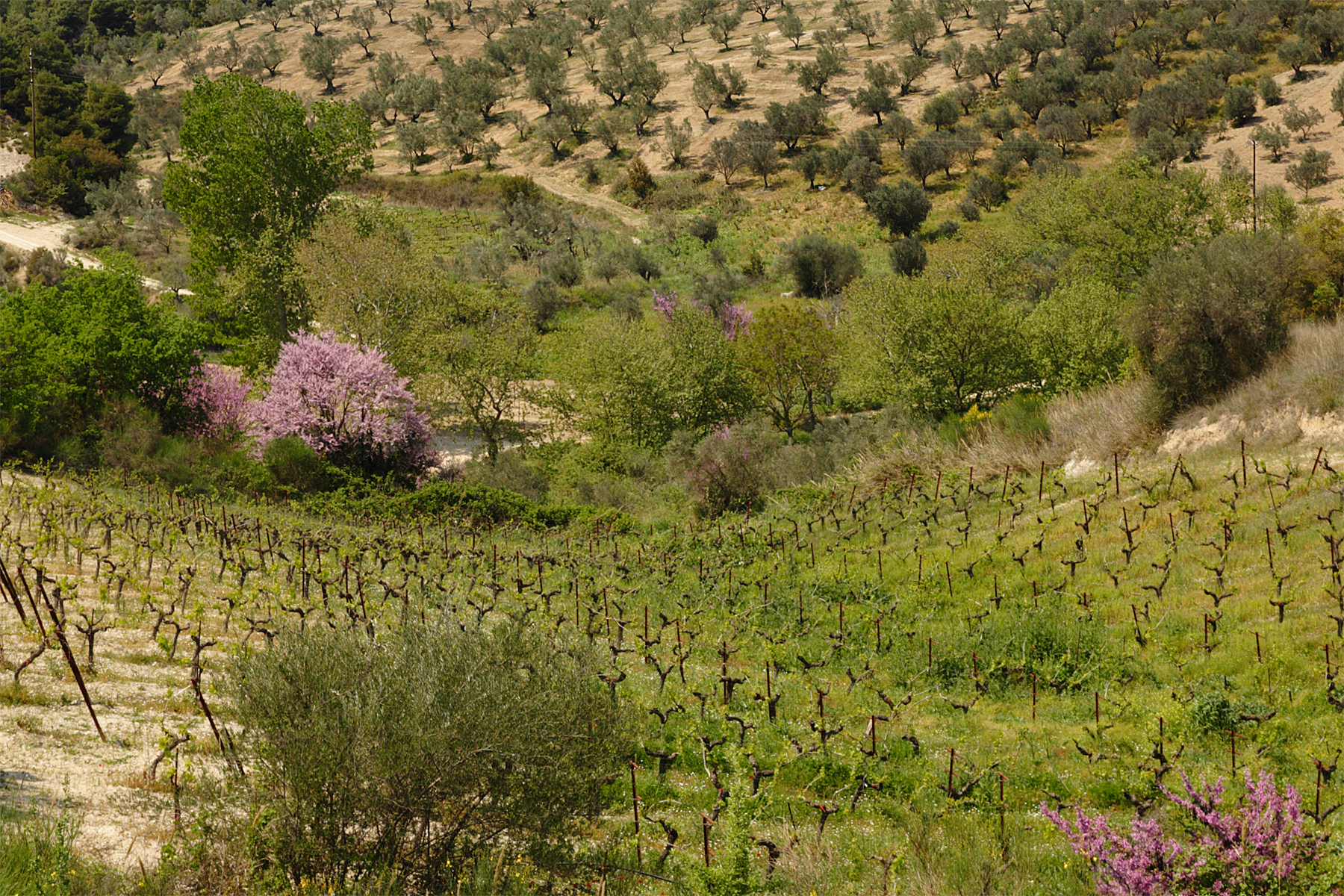
Wine, olives and biodiversity in the vicinity of Nemea

Nemea (Greek: Νεμέα) is a town in Corinthia, Greece, and the seat of municipality with the same name (Δήμος Νεμέας). It is located a few kilometres west of ancient Nemea, with a population of under four thousand people. The municipality has an area of 204.708 km^{2}.

== Geography ==
Nemea (altitude ca. 300m) is situated in a relatively plain basin surrounded by mountains, that reach ca. 750m.. The ancient town, Αρχαία Νεμέα, (at ca. 360m) is in a somewhat smaller basin to the east. Both basins empty through their own valley into the Gulf of Corinth. The surface of the two basins varies by only a few meters. The soil contains weathered elements of Limestone. The composition of the soil, the basin's geology, the altitude and the climate are ideal for viticulture.

== Economy ==
Its primary industry is agriculture and it is the hub for several small villages circling it, including Koutsi, Petri, and Leriza. Nemea is famous for its many wines grown on the plains that surround it. It is also home to DK Distributors, one of the largest distribution companies in Eastern Europe.

=== Wine region ===
Located next to the new town of Nemea, approximately 30 kilometres (19 mi) from Corinth, the appellation of Nemea is the most important red wine AOC of southern Greece and arguably of all of Greece. Also Nemea is the biggest vineyard of all Balkan territory. In the Nemea region, the indigenous Greek Agiorgitiko grape variety is grown. It produces wines famous for their deep red color, complex aroma and long, velvety palate.

== See also ==
- Nemea
- Archaia Nemea
