= Cohesion Fund =

Financial instrument of the European Union

The Cohesion Fund, one of the five European Structural and Investment Funds of the European Union, provides support to Member States with a gross national income per capita below 90% EU-27 average to strengthen the economic, social and territorial cohesion of the EU. Common regulatory provisions apply to the five ESIF funds, along with the Just Transition Fund, the Asylum, Migration and Integration Fund, the Internal Security Fund and the Instrument for Financial Support for Border Management and Visa Policy.

The fund's purpose includes support for investments in the environmental field and on Trans-European Networks in the area of transport infrastructure (TEN-T).

== History ==
The European Council meetings held in Lisbon, 26-27 June 1992, and Edinburgh, 11-12 December 1992, agreed the establishment of the Cohesion Fund. This was formalized in 1993, as part of the Delors II package of the Treaty of Maastricht, with the goal of reinforcing the regional policy of the EU. Since then, its goal has been the economic convergence among European regions, by means of public investment in transportation infrastructure and environmental projects. It was a way to compensate, to a certain extent, the strict policies on public debt that were agreed by the European members: these funds allowed to maintain both a controlled deficit and public investment in strategic areas.

Cohesion Funds cover seven-year funding periods:

- Up to 31 December 2006
- 2007–2013
- 2014–2020
- 2021–2027

Originally, the traditional recipients of these funds were Greece, Portugal, Spain and Ireland, among others; but since new countries joined the EU in 2004, 2007 and 2014, the funds have been located mainly in Central and Eastern Europe. For the 2021–2027 period, the Cohesion Fund is available to Bulgaria, Croatia, Cyprus, the Czech Republic, Estonia, Greece, Hungary, Latvia, Lithuania, Malta, Poland, Portugal, Romania, Slovakia and Slovenia. 37% of the overall financial allocation of the Cohesion Fund is expected to contribute to climate objectives. Member states with above-average economic output per person, including the United Kingdom before Brexit, are unable to access Cohesion Fund resources.

On October 2022, The European Commission announced EU cohesion funds (75 billion euros) for Poland would be frozen over concerns over the rule of law.

On December 2022, The European Commission announced it would hold back all 22 billion euros of EU cohesion funds for Hungary until its government meets conditions related to judiciary independence, academic freedoms, LGBTQI rights and the asylum system.

== Effectiveness ==
The scientific literature on the topic is ambiguous, certain research projects show a positive impact of the funds on the economy of the recipient countries, while others have ambiguous results; more rarely, they find a negative effect. Some studies point out that the impact depends on the area of investment: funds dedicated to transportation infrastructure and to the energy sector have the biggest positive effect, while allocation to environmental goals are negative in the short-term, but become positive in the medium and long-run. Some critics have argued that the cohesion fund may entrench stagnation, distort incentives, and defer essential reforms by contributing to a modern resource curse in the regions that receive funding.

A weakness often associated to the allocation of the Cohesion Fund between countries is that it is solely determined using the gross national income per capita. Experts have shown that, based on that criterion, some countries are not getting funds although being in a worse socioeconomic situation than some of the actual recipients. This is problematic from the point of view of the EU, since the evidence shows a relation between Euroscepticism and middle-income regions which do not receive enough funds. To better evaluate the socioeconomic situation of the recipient countries, an index that includes more socioeconomic variables has been proposed.

Another concern of the EU institutions and, more specifically, of the European Commission, is the lack of visibility of these funds. The literature on the topic reveals that the citizens' awareness about the Cohesion Fund is not linked to the amount of funds invested in their regions. In this regard, the more vulnerable groups of EU citizens such as the unemployed, the recipients of welfare, and those who live in economic destitution, have the most sceptic view of the European institutions as providers of social security. To address this, the European Commission is stressing the importance of improving the communication with the citizenship and between the differente stakeholders (NGO's, EU institutions and national managing institutions).
