= Xylokastro-Evrostina =

Xylokastro-Evrostina Ξυλόκαστρο-Ευρωστίνα
- Municipality
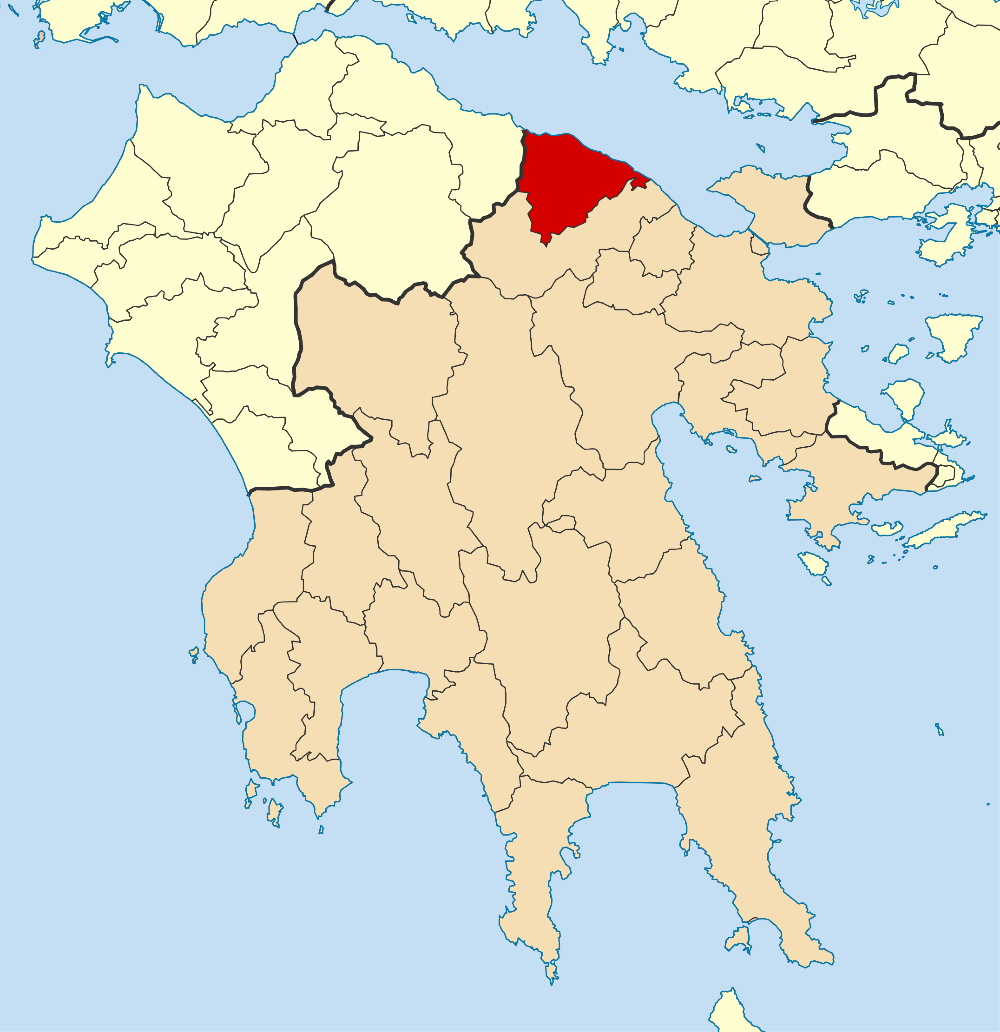

- Location within Greece
- Coordinates: 38°4′N 22°38′E
- Country: Greece
- Administrative region: Peloponnese
- Regional unit: Corinthia
- Seat: Xylokastro

Area
  - Municipality: 411.7 km^{2} (159.0 sq mi)

Population (2021)
  - Municipality: 15,570
  - Density: 37.82/km^{2} (97.95/sq mi)
- Time zone: UTC+2 (EET)
  - Summer (DST): UTC+3 (EEST)
- Website: www.xylokastro-evrostini.gov.gr

Xylokastro–Evrostina (Greek: Ξυλόκαστρο-Ευρωστίνα) is a municipality in the Corinthia regional unit, Peloponnese, Greece. The seat of the municipality is the town Xylokastro. The municipality has an area of 411.667 km^{2}.

== Municipality ==
The municipality Xylokastro–Evrostina was formed at the 2011 local government reform by the merger of the following 2 former municipalities, that became municipal units:

- Evrostina
- Xylokastro
