= Perachora =

Perachora Περαχώρα
- Settlement
- Location within Greece
- Coordinates: 38°2′N 22°57′E
- Country: Greece
- Administrative region: Peloponnese
- Regional unit: Corinthia
- Municipality: Loutraki-Perachora-Agioi Theodoroi
- Municipal unit: Loutraki-Perachora
- Community: Loutraki-Perachora
- Elevation: 300 m (980 ft)

Population (2021)
  - Total: 1,025
- Time zone: UTC+2 (EET)
  - Summer (DST): UTC+3 (EEST)
- Postal code: 281 00
- Area code: 26710
- Vehicle registration: ΚΡ

Perachora (Greek: Περαχώρα) is an inland settlement in Loutraki-Perachora-Agioi Theodoroi, Corinthia, in the region of Peloponnese in Greece. In Antiquity it was called Peiraion.

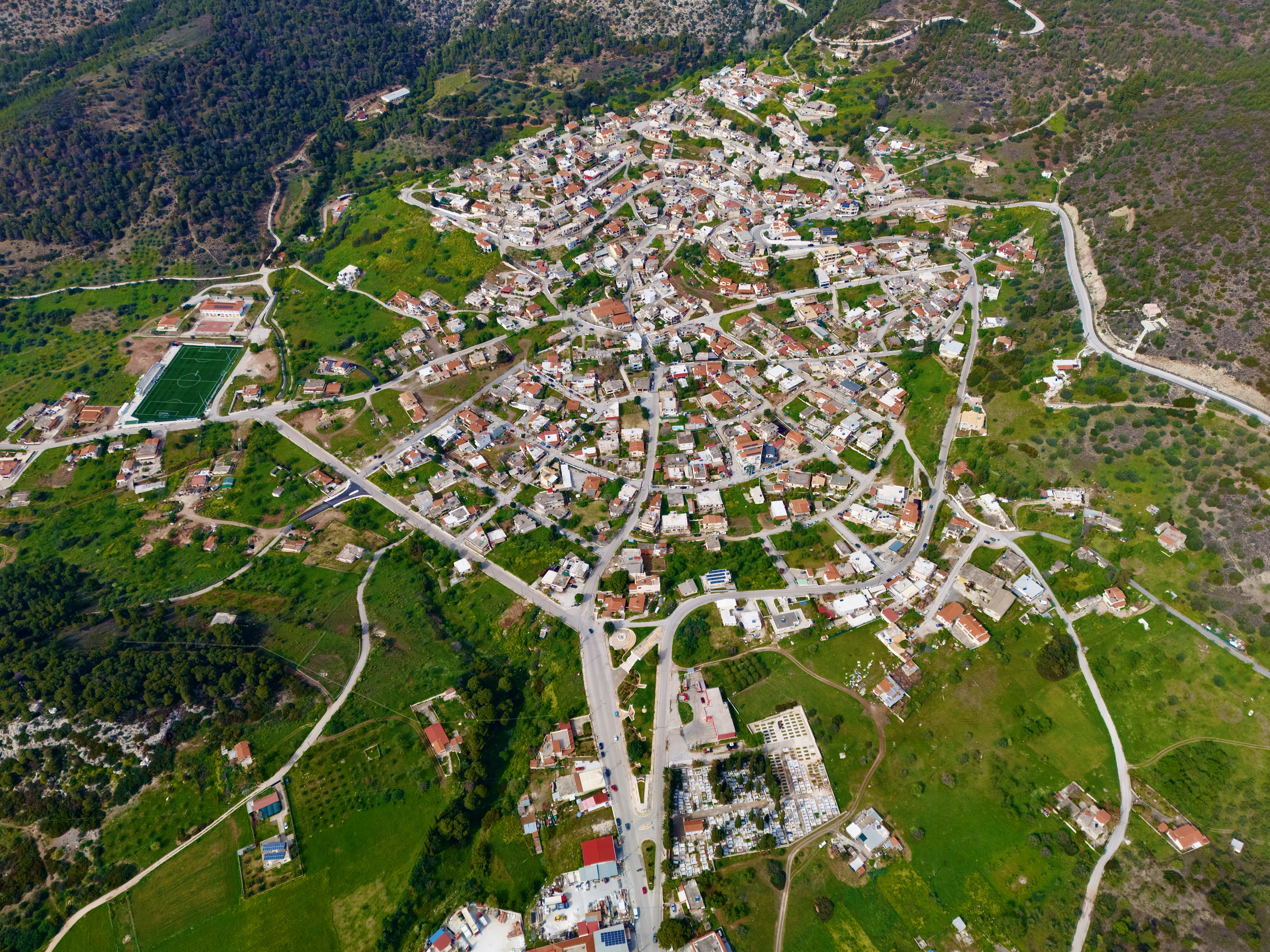
Perachora aerial view.

It is located about 7 km northwest of the town of Loutraki in the foothills of the Geraneia mountains. Perachora's name is a transformation of the phrase "Peraia Chora" meaning in Greek "the land on the other side" of the Isthmus of Corinth and the ancient city of Corinth. Perachora has a population of about 1,000 and it is built 300 metres above sea level.

The remains of the Heraion of Perachora, an ancient temple of Hera Limenia, are situated at the cape 8 km west of Perachora. The Limni Vouliagmeni lagoon is 6 km west of the village. In the lagoon area the epic movie The 300 Spartans was filmed in 1962. The area around the village has typically agricultural Mediterranean scenery with green-silver olive trees being the single most important crop. Extended pine forests exist in some of the surrounding mountains, sometimes reaching the coast. Notable local products include virgin olive oil and natural pine resin.

== Historical population ==
Historical population
| Year | Pop. | ±% |
|---|---|---|
| 1991 | 1,285 | — |
| 2001 | 1,238 | −3.7% |
| 2011 | 1,141 | −7.8% |
| 2021 | 1,025 | −10.2% |
