= Dilys Powell =

British film critic and writer (1901–1995)

Dilys Powell CBE
- Dilys Powell in 1984
- Born: Elizabeth Dilys Powell; 20 July 1901; Bridgnorth, Shropshire, England
- Died: 3 June 1995 (aged 93); London, England
- Education: Somerville College, Oxford (BA)
- Occupations: Film critic, journalist, author
- Spouses: Humfry Payne (m. 1926; died 1936); Leonard Russell (m. 1943; died 1974)
- Writing career
- Language: English
- Years active: 1939–1992
- Subject: Film

Elizabeth Dilys Powell CBE (20 July 1901 – 3 June 1995) was a British film critic and travel writer who contributed to The Sunday Times for more than 50 years. Powell was known for her receptiveness to cultural change in the cinema and coined many classic phrases about films and actors. She was a founding member of the Independent Television Authority (ITA), which launched commercial television in the UK. She was also the second female president of the Classical Association. Powell wrote several books on films and her travels in Greece.

== Early life and education ==
Dilys Powell was born in Bridgnorth, Shropshire, to Thomas Powell (a bank manager) and Mary Jane Lloyd. She attended Talbot Heath School, Bournemouth before winning an exhibition to read Modern Languages at Somerville College, Oxford.

Powell considered studying Classics (Literae Humaniores) – "Greats" – at Oxford University, but she was advised against it by her brother: '"Don't" he said; "the Classics are a terrible grind for a girl, and you will be prematurely wrinkled."' Powell took his advice, but later regretted it, feeling that she had been robbed of "deep and solid pleasures", having "small Latin...and, goodness knows, less Greek". (Note: Powell quoted Ben Jonson's elegy for William Shakespeare, which described him as having "small Latin and less Greek".)

At Oxford, Powell met an archaeologist, Humfry Payne (19 February 1902 – 9 May 1936), whom she married in 1926. While studying at Oxford, she made news headlines in the Daily Mail after being "taken out for tea" and climbing over the wall to go out with Payne; she was rusticated for two terms and the principal accused her of "dragging the name of Somerville in the dust". She graduated with a first-class honours degree in Modern Languages in 1923.

== Career ==
After graduation, Powell spent a period as personal assistant to Lady Ottoline Morrell before joining the literary department of The Sunday Times in 1928.

In 1929, her husband Humfry Payne was appointed director of the British School at Athens. From 1931 to 1936, Powell spent part of each year in Greece, frequently attending excavations where her husband was working, including the excavation of the Heraion of Perachora, as well as attending an excavation at Abydos, Egypt. Payne died in Athens in 1936 from a staphylococcus infection. They had no children.

Powell continued her periodic visits to Greece after 1936, until the Second World War made travel difficult. In 1939 Powell was appointed film critic at The Sunday Times. In 1941, she found war work with a Greek connection in the Political Warfare Executive, which oversaw Britain's propaganda in occupied Europe; she remained there until 1945, where she was tasked with making sure that the BBC's broadcasts to Greece accurately represented British policies. In June 1943, she married Leonard Russell (1906–1974), the literary editor at The Sunday Times.

Powell was one of the founding members of the Independent Television Authority (ITA) from 1954, despite initial concerns about her possible conflicts of interest (she wrote for a newspaper that was backing one of the ITV network franchises, but its bid was eventually withdrawn). She resigned her post at the ITA in 1956, in protest at the government's refusal to come up with funding which it had promised to the authority in the Television Act 1954. She was a long-time regular panel member of the BBC radio word game, My Word!.

Powell's journalism led a change in the writing of cinema criticism. To quote the British Film Institute: "she was open to new directions in cinema and was not constrained by the middle class shibboleths of 'good taste', unlike her rival C. A. Lejeune, film critic for The Observer from 1928 to 1960." She remained film critic at The Sunday Times until 1979 – a compilation of her reviews was published in 1989 as The Golden Screen – but from 1976 she also began writing about films on television, which she continued to do until the end of her life. Her last piece, a review of Barry Lyndon, appeared in The Times on the day of her death. She also served as film critic for Punch until its first closure in 1992.

Powell, a philhellene, made frequent visits to Greece, including attending the British School at Athens excavations at Emporio on Chios in 1954 in order to report on the excavations for The Sunday Times. She was the author of several books about the country, including Remember Greece (1941); An Affair of the Heart (1958), describing her repeated visits to the village of Perachora, site of Payne's excavations of the Heraion; and The Villa Ariadne (1973), a memoir of the archaeologists associated with the house built by Sir Arthur Evans near the palace of Knossos, including several (such as John Pendlebury) who were active in the Cretan Resistance during World War II. Other works include a biography of Payne, The Traveller's Journey is Done (1943). Powell served as president of the Classical Association from 1966 to 1967, giving her presidential address at the University of Reading on 5 April 1967. She was only the second female President of the Classical Association, following Professor Dorothy Tarrant (President 1958-1959). Powell was made a Commander of the Order of the British Empire (CBE) in 1974, awarded a British Film Institute Fellowship in 1983, and made an Honorary Fellow of Somerville College, Oxford University, in 1991. Powell was a Fellow of the Royal Society of Literature. She served as a Governor of the British Film Institute from 1948 to 1952.

In 1991, the Critics' Circle Theatre Award established the annual Dilys Powell Award for Excellence in Film in her honour. The first recipient of the award was Dirk Bogarde; other recipients have included Christopher Lee, Richard Attenborough, Judi Dench, Helena Bonham Carter, Kenneth Branagh, and Kate Winslet.

== Publications ==
- Descent from Parnassus (1934), London: Cresset Press (essays on modern poets)
- Remember Greece (1941), London: Hodder & Stoughton
- The Traveller's Journey is Done (1943), London: Hodder & Stoughton (Humfry Payne at the British School of Archaeology at Athens)
- Films since 1939 (1947), London: Longmans, Green & Co (for the British Council)
- Coco (1952), London: Hodder & Stoughton (biography of a dog)
- An Affair of the Heart (1958), London: Hodder & Stoughton
- The Mirror of the Present (1967), London: John Murray (presidential address to the Classical Association at the University of Reading)
- The Villa Ariadne (1973), London: Hodder and Stoughton. New edition by Eland in 2016: ISBN 978-1-78060-035-2
- The Golden Screen: Fifty Years at the Films (1989), London: Pavilion, ISBN 1-85145-342-3 (ed. George Perry)
- The Dilys Powell film reader (1991), Manchester: Carcanet, ISBN 0-85635-912-2
