= Geraneia =

Mountain range in Greece

- Γεράνεια
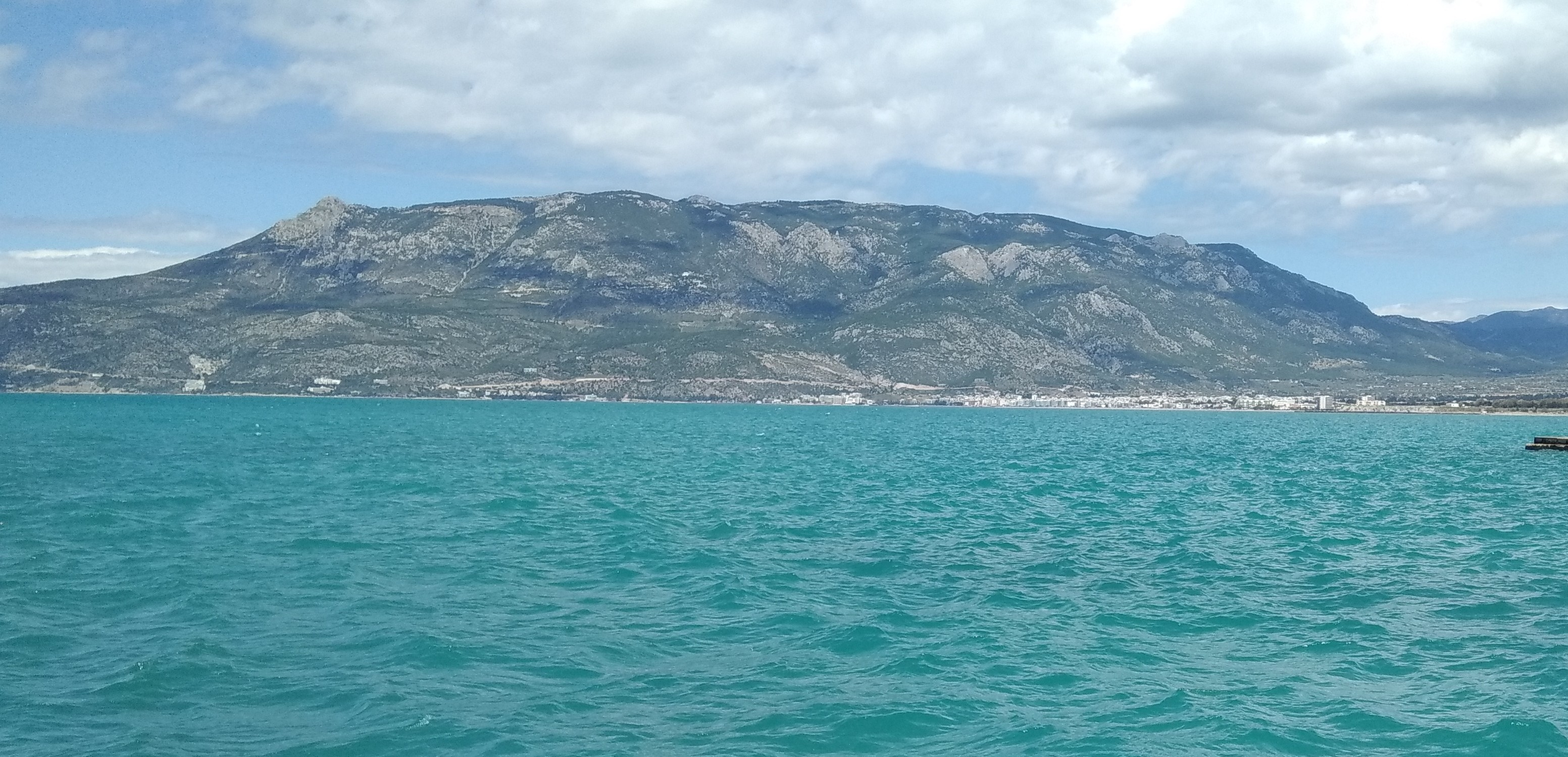
- View of the Geraneia from Corinth.

Highest point
- Peak: Makryplagi
- Elevation: 1,365 m (4,478 ft)
- Prominence: 1,032 m (3,386 ft)
- Listing: Ribu
- Coordinates: 38°01′16″N 23°08′07″E

Dimensions
- Length: 30 km (19 mi) north to south
- Width: 10 km (6.2 mi) east to west

Geography
- Location within Greece
- Country: Greece
- Regional unit: Corinthia; West Attica

Geraneia Mountains or Yerania Ori (Greek: Γεράνεια Όρη) are a mountain range in Corinthia and West Attica, Greece. Its highest point is the peak Makryplagi (Greek: Μακρυπλάγι), elevation 1,351 m. It covers the northern part of the isthmus between the Gulf of Corinth and the Saronic Gulf. It spans 5–10 km from north to south and 30 km from east to west.

The geography of Geraneia includes forests in the south, the west and the northern part at an elevation of under 900 to 1,000 m. Barren land is in the central part. The grasslands and some bushes lies to the northwest. Farmlands and some barren land lies to the south.

The name of the mountain dates back to ancient times. During the Peloponnesian War, the Corinthians and their allies occupied the heights of Geraneia and marched to Megara with a large force.

The wolf pack of Geraneia Mountains is the southernmost in Greece, possibly in Europe, too.

== Nearest places ==
- Agioi Theodoroi, south
- Megara, east
- Kineta, southeast
- Loutraki, southwest
