= Loutraki =

Seaside resort town in Corinthia, Greece

Coordinates: 37°58′30″N 22°58′36″E

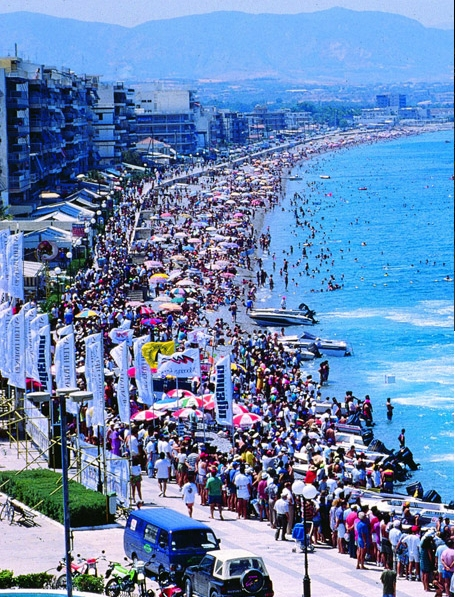
Loutraki

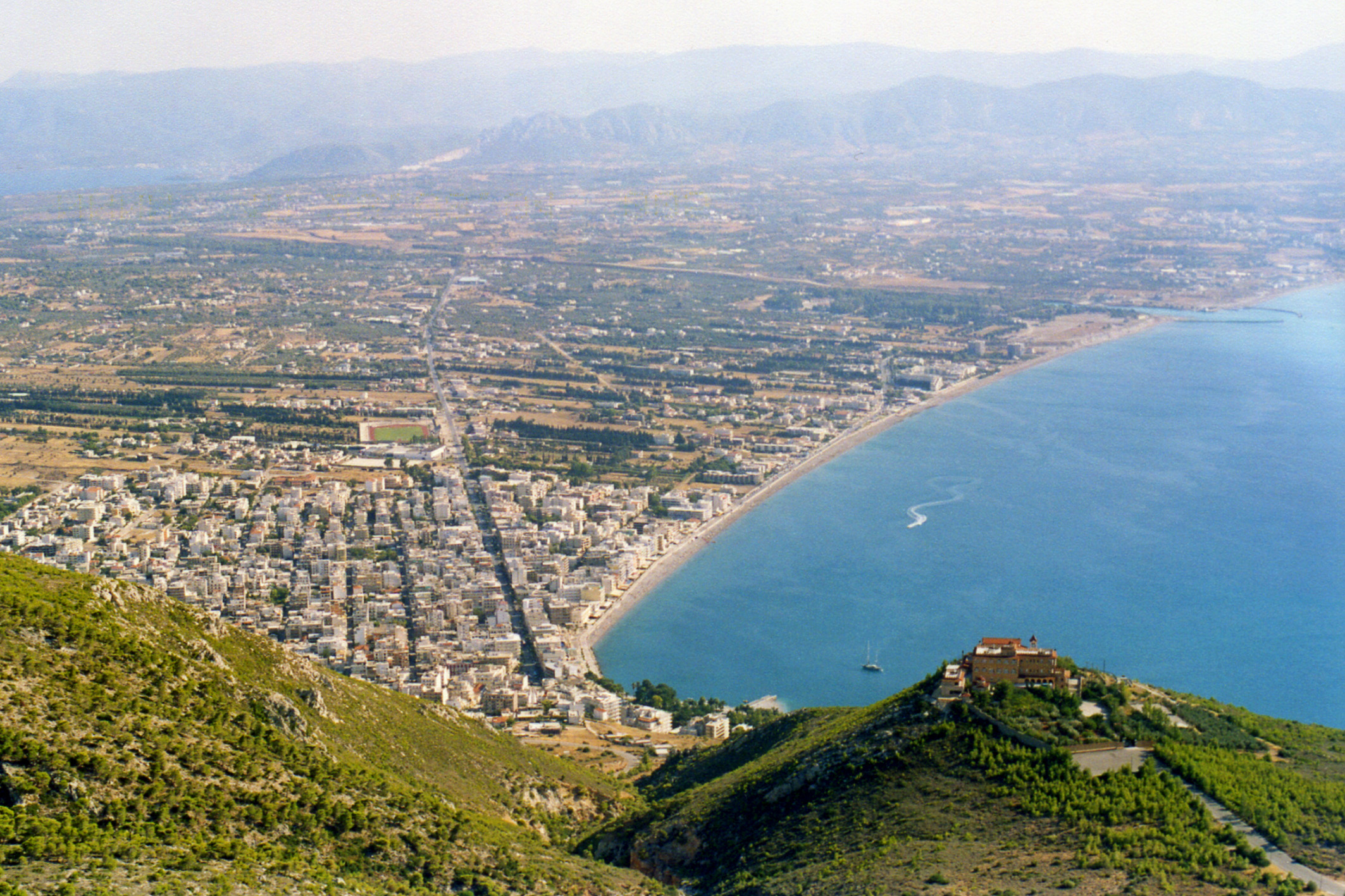
View from the monastery of Saint Patapios

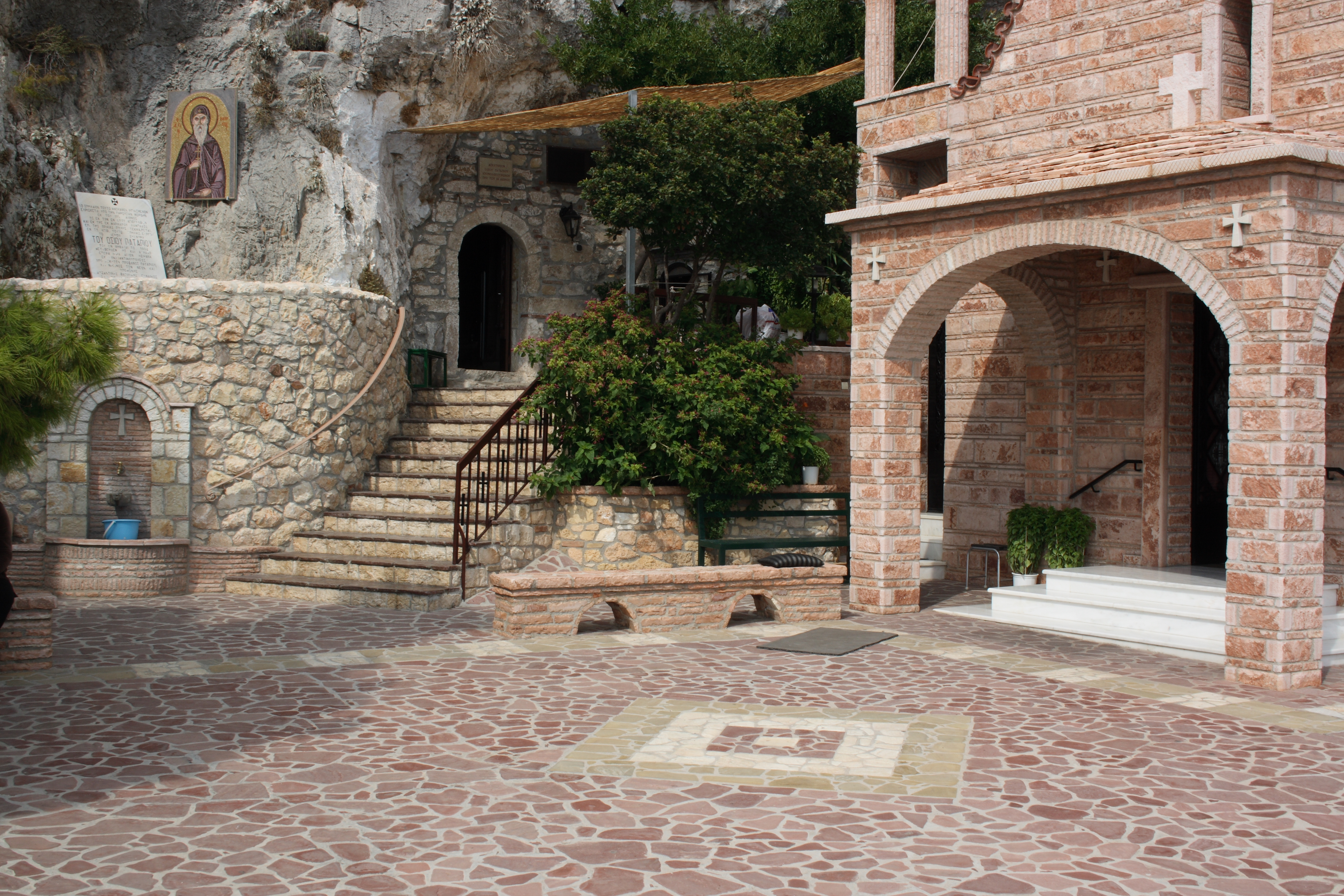
Inside the monastery of Saint Patapios

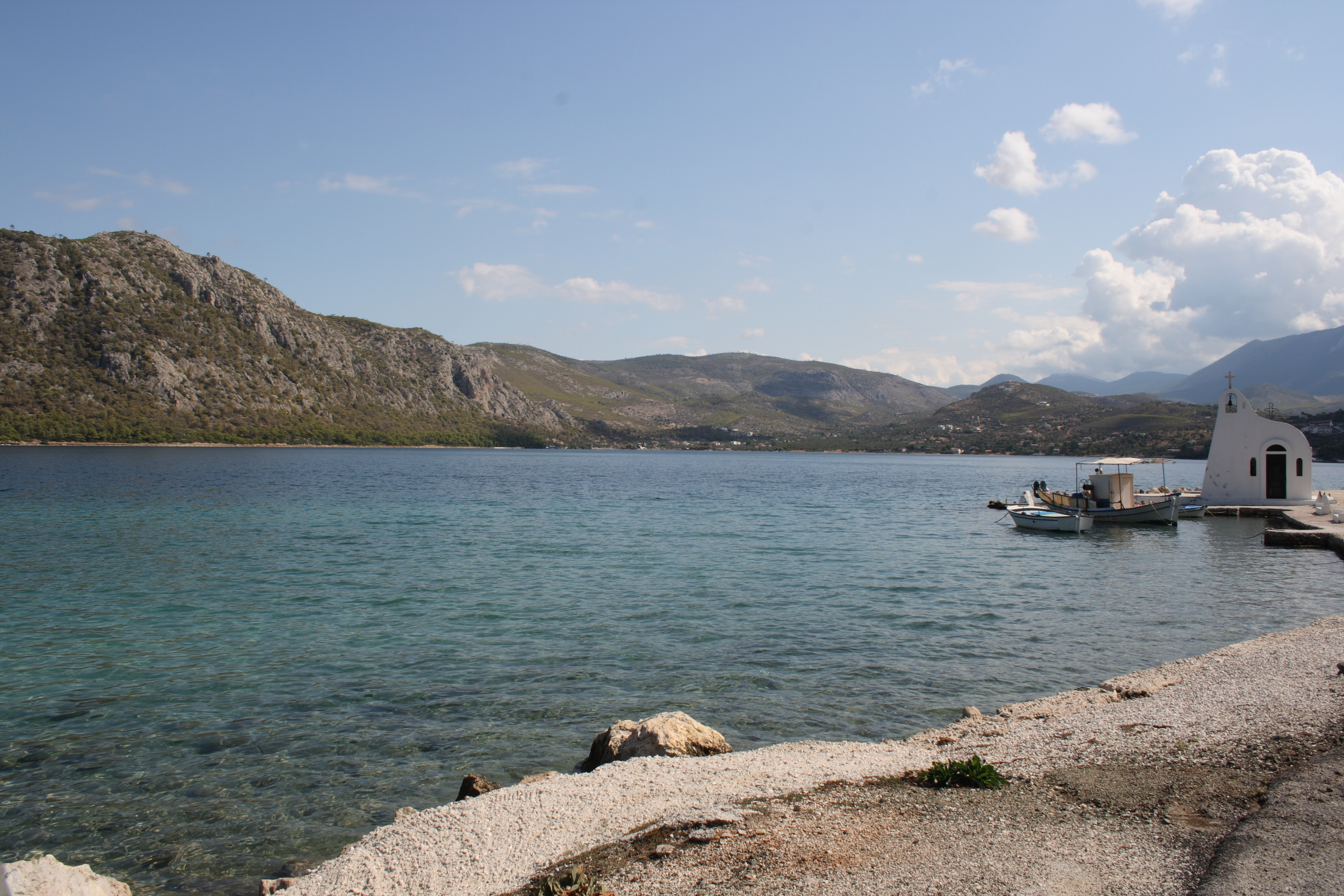
The Vouliagmeni lake

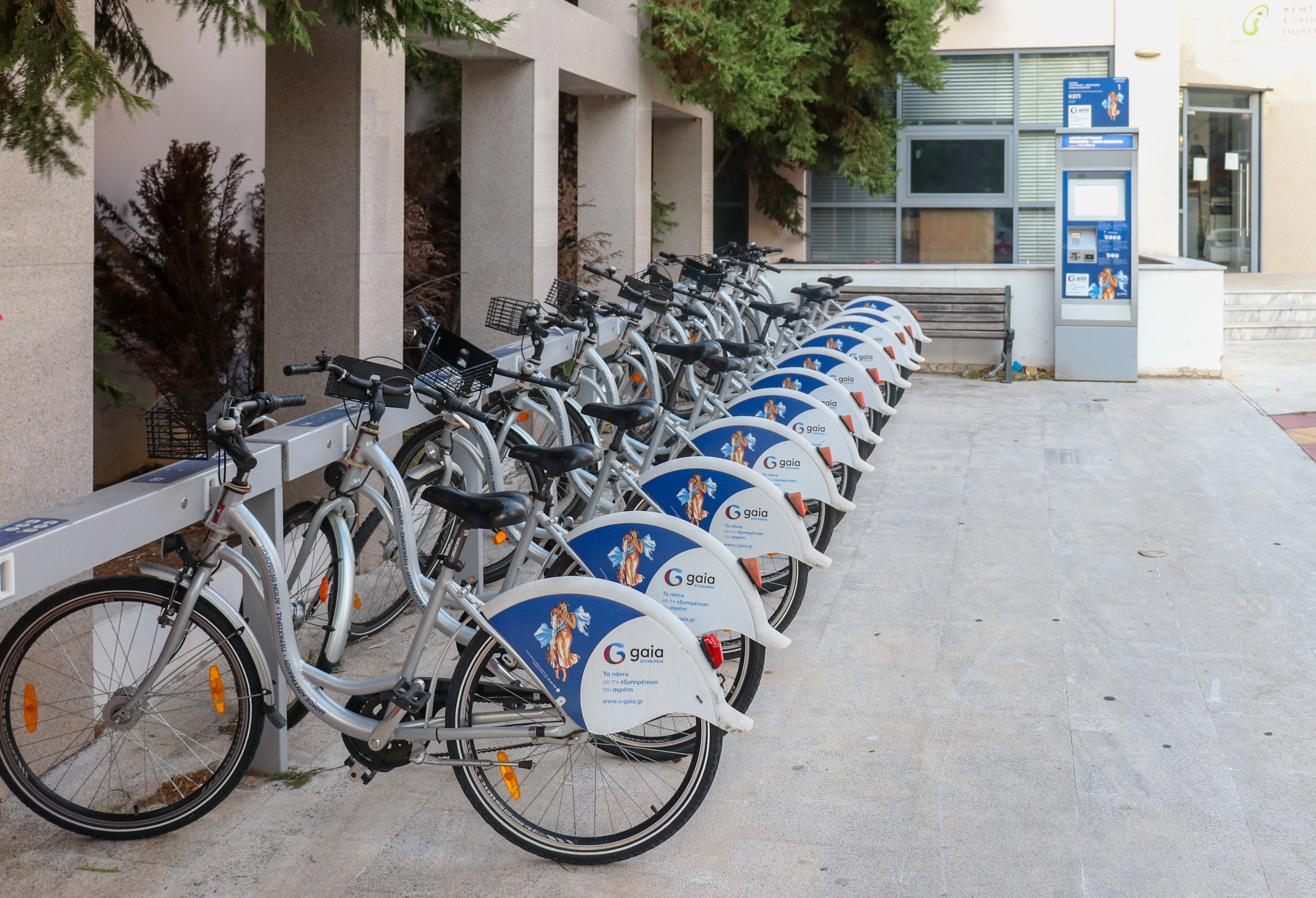
Bicycle sharing

Loutraki (Greek: Λουτράκι) is a seaside resort town on the Gulf of Corinth, in Corinthia, Greece. It is located 81 kilometres (50 miles) west of Athens and 8 kilometres (5 miles) northeast of Corinth. Loutraki is the seat of the municipality Loutraki-Perachora-Agioi Theodoroi. The town is known for its vast natural springs and its therapeutic spas. It is a popular tourist destination for its crystal clear waters. The Casino of Loutraki has thousands of visitors every day. According to the 2021 census, it has a population of 12,212.

== History ==
In antiquity a town called Thermae (Greek: Θερμαί, hot springs) existed on the site. In 1847, an announcement in Italy asserting the therapeutic benefits of bathing in the natural thermal spas found in Loutraki caused an influx of settlers in the surrounding areas, thereby creating modern Loutraki. In 1928, Loutraki was completely destroyed by an earthquake, and rebuilt. A large park was created by claiming land from the sea, using the rubble of the fallen houses. Another strong earthquake hit the area in 1981 but with less destructive effects.

== Name ==
The name Loutraki is a direct reference to the thermal spas of the region. It derives from the Loutro(n) (Greek: Λουτρό(ν)) that means bath, bath-house, spa or thermae. The Greek word loutro is directly translated as thermae in English, which was also the ancient name of the region.

== Geography ==
The town is bordered by the Gulf of Corinth in the west, while the mountain range of Geraneia dominates north and east. There is a small valley in the southwest that leads to the Isthmus of Corinth. Although part of Corinthia Prefecture, Loutraki is situated northwest of the Corinth Canal thus not on the Peloponnese.

== Sightseeing ==
A monastery named Osios Patapios is located about 10 km (6 mi) NW of Loutraki on Geraneia mountain, offering great view of the Isthmos area and the Gulf of Corinth.

Loutraki is well known for its Casino (Club Hotel Casino Loutraki), one of the biggest in Europe.

The Heraion of Perachora (sanctuary of the goddess Hera) is an archaeological site of great significance located at the end of the Perachora peninsula and for the Vouliagmeni lake.

Visitors and tourists can visit several buildings of Loutraki.

- On G. Lekkas str. there is a two-story house, built in 1928, which bears the hallmarks of his era (single volume and form a solid banister, exciting door). It holds a position in the urban fabric of the region and is an interesting group with other buildings of the street.
- Also on G. Lekkas str. is the landmark building of the hotel "Palace", built in 1923 and owned by the George K. Aggelidis Hotel Company SA. This five-storey hotel was repaired in 1928 after an earthquake. The vertical axis of symmetry is predominant. Two marble staircases face each other, passing under the arched openings. The last two floors are unified, with the central part protruding from the building and raised at the end. The decorations are linear. The bearing structure consists of masonry, blocks, reinforced concrete.
- One of the old villas of the old town of Loutraki is on Syros str., with an area of 135 sq.m., which was built in 1956 on the site of a pre-1950 house. The bearing structure consists of reinforced concrete. The purchase and renovation was the work of the Cypriot industrialist distiller Kekkos Ioannidis, when he came to Greece from the Congo of Africa. It bears the hallmarks of his era (simple volume and format, high ceilings, mosaics, solid gate and door), has large terraces, and is surrounded by gardens with fruit trees and roses, the latter of which dominate a fountain garden. Today is in the hands of another owner, who erected in the garden a bronze bust of General George V. Papagiannopoulos, who was wounded in the war.

== Nearest places ==
- Perachora (NW)
- Corinth (SW)

== Historical population ==
| Year | Town population |
|---|---|
| 1981 | 8,543 |
| 1991 | 9,388 |
| 2001 | 11,383 |

== Notable people ==
- Anna Synodinou (1927–2016), actress and politician
- Pantelis Zervos (1913–1991), actor

== Twin towns — sister cities ==
Loutraki is twinned with Cēsis, Latvia.

== See also ==
- List of settlements in Corinthia
- Loutraki-Perachora
- Perachora
