= Loutraki-Perachora =

Loutraki-Perachora Λουτράκι-Περαχώρα
- Municipal unit
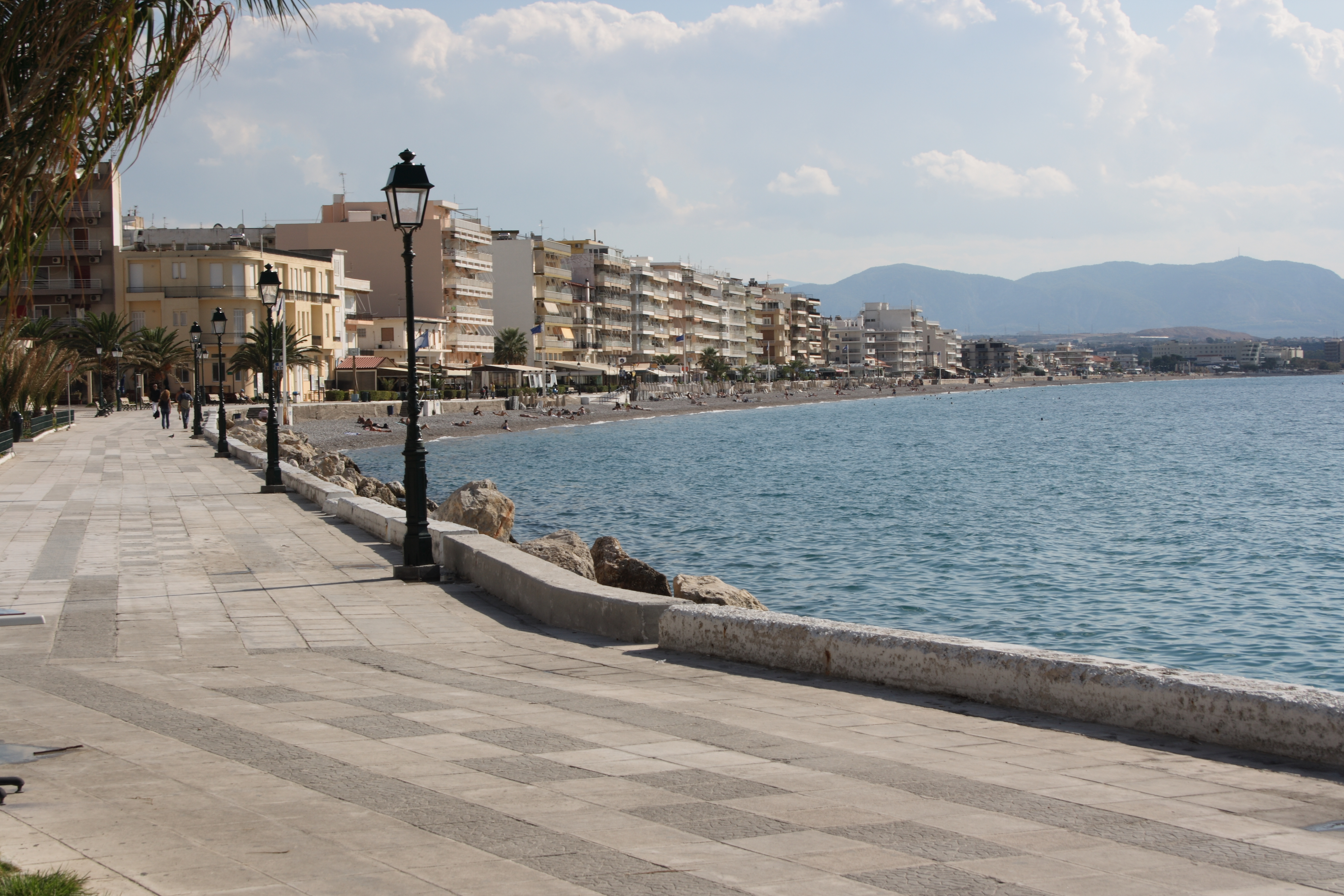

- Location within the regional unit

- Location within Greece
- Coordinates: 37°59′N 22°59′E
- Country: Greece
- Administrative region: Peloponnese
- Regional unit: Corinthia
- Municipality: Loutraki-Perachora-Agioi Theodoroi

Area
  - Municipal unit: 196.870 km^{2} (76.012 sq mi)
- Elevation: 82 m (269 ft)

Population (2021)
  - Municipal unit: 17,082
  - Municipal unit density: 86.768/km^{2} (224.73/sq mi)
  - Community: 13,919
- Time zone: UTC+2 (EET)
  - Summer (DST): UTC+3 (EEST)
- Postal code: 203 00
- Area code: 27440
- Vehicle registration: ΚΡ
- Website: www.loutraki.gr

Loutraki-Perachora (Greek: Λουτράκι-Περαχώρα) is a former municipality in Corinthia, Peloponnese, Greece. Since the 2011 local governmental reform it is part of the municipality Loutraki-Perachora-Agioi Theodoroi, of which it is a municipal unit. The municipal unit has an area of 196.870 km^{2} (76.012 sq mi).

The region of Loutraki-Perachora is a tourist destination for summer and weekend visitors from the Athens metropolitan area, due to its proximity (about 80 km; 50 mi) and the clean and sandy beaches surrounding the town of Loutraki and other seaside settlements.

The area is also famous for the Heraion of Perachora (sanctuary of the goddess Hera), an archaeological site of significance located at the end of the Perachora peninsula.

== Loutraki ==
Loutraki, the most important settlement and the seat of the municipality, is a seaside town with a population of 12,212 inhabitants (2021 census), known for its natural environment, spas and mineral water springs. Recently one of the biggest casinos in Europe has been built in Loutraki. A modern convention center has opened gates and a marina is also planned.

Loutraki sometimes is perceived as the last boundary of the Athens metropolitan area. Many Athenians live in the community permanently or seasonally.

The municipality lies on both sides of the Corinth Canal, but primarily to its northeast; a small part lies on the southwest side of the canal, on the Peloponnese Peninsula. map The Corinth Canal is a partial border between the Corinthian Community and the Loutraki-Perachora Community. The Canal area, however, is the responsibility of the latter. A privately owned company operates ship traffic on the canal.

Loutraki's springs of mineral water are well known for their qualities, and a bottling industry has been developed due to this fact.

== Perachora ==
Perachora is a smaller village (1,025 inhabitants) NW of Loutraki at a landlocked position surrounded by mountainous landscape. Large pine forests are found there. These are the main source of the local production of natural resin. Other large towns include Kyras Vrysi (1,149 inhabitants) and Isthmia (1,109 inhabitants), the latter of which lies at the southeast entrance to the Corinth Canal. Together they form the Loutraki-Perachora municipal unit. Smaller settlements like Pisia (85 inhabitants) and Schinos (70 inhabitants) are also attached to the Municipality.

== Historical population ==
Year	Population
1981	8,543
1991	14,084
2001	15,077
2011	16,578
2021	17,082
