= Schinos =

Schinos (Greek: Σχίνος) may refer to several villages in Greece:

- Schinos, a village near Agrinio, Aetolia-Acarnania
- Schinos, Corinthia, a village
