= Pisia =

Pisia Πίσια
- Community
- Location within Greece
- Coordinates: 38°01′12″N 22°59′17″E
- Country: Greece
- Administrative region: Peloponnese
- Regional unit: Corinthia
- Municipality: Loutraki-Perachora-Agioi Theodoroi
- Municipal unit: Loutraki-Perachora

Population (2021)
  - Community: 454
- Time zone: UTC+2 (EET)
  - Summer (DST): UTC+3 (EEST)

Pisia (Greek: Πίσια) is a village and a community in northeastern Corinthia, Greece. Part of the municipality Loutraki-Perachora-Agioi Theodoroi, it is situated south of the Alkyonides Gulf. The community consists of the villages Pisia, Agia Sotira, Vamvakes, Mavrolimni and Schinos. Agia Sotira, Vamvakes and Mavrolimni are situated on the coast.

Until the early 1970s there were only olive plantations but during the 1990s there was rapid development and many visitors came to the area. Helping make this possible was the then newly laid asphalt road. It is now a popular weekend destination for the citizens of Athens. There are two beaches, one sandy with tavernas on the shore and one pebbly with little or no shops nearby. It is still relatively undeveloped and retains a relaxed and laid back atmosphere. Many Athenians bought land years ago and built weekend retreats for themselves and their families to escape Athens in the hot summer.
