= Isthmia, Corinthia =

Isthmia Ισθμία
- Community
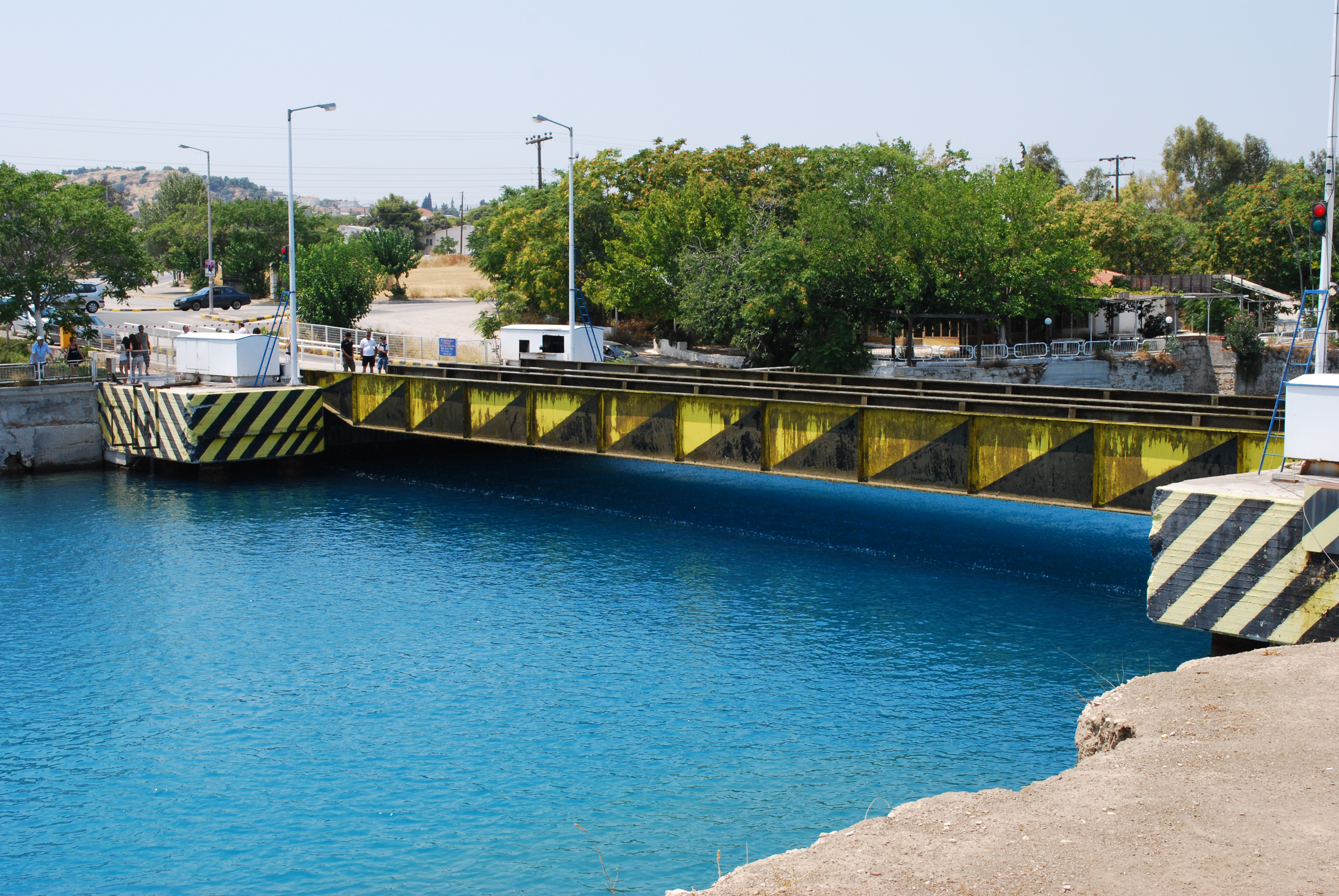
- The submersible bridge of Corinth Canal in Isthmia

- Location within Greece
- Coordinates: 37°55′N 23°00′E
- Country: Greece
- Administrative region: Peloponnese
- Regional unit: Corinthia
- Municipality: Loutraki-Perachora-Agioi Theodoroi
- Municipal unit: Loutraki-Perachora
- Elevation: 10 m (33 ft)

Population (2021)
  - Community: 2,709
- Time zone: UTC+2 (EET)
  - Summer (DST): UTC+3 (EEST)

Isthmia (Greek: Ισθμία) is a Greek village and community 7.5 km (4.7 mi) southeast of Corinth. It is located in the south entry of Corinth Canal. The community spreads in the place where the Isthmian Games were held in antiquity. So, near the village important ruins of the archaeological site are kept including the Temple of Poseidon, the ancient stadium and the ancient theatre. Administratively, Isthmia belongs to Loutraki-Perachora-Agioi Theodoroi municipality and Loutraki-Perachora municipal unit.

== Description ==
Isthmia is located in an area where the Isthmian Games were held. The Isthmian Games started in 582 BC and finished during 5th century AD. In modern times, Isthmia was a small village. But after the digging of Corinth Canal between 1880 and 1893 the village developed. Today it is a community, including five settlements Isthmia, Kyras Vrysi, Kalamaki, Paradeisos, Agios Charalampos and Kavos.

=== Historical population ===
Census	Settlement	Community
1991	1,006	
2001	1,030	2,669
2011	1,134	2,760
2021	1,109	2,709

== Sights ==
- Corinth Canal, the large artificial canal that connects Saronic and Gulf of Corinth.
- Archaeological site of Isthmia, the place where the ancient Isthmian Games were held. It includes the ruins of Temple of Poseidon, the ancient stadium and the ancient theatre
- Archaeological museum of Isthmia. museum with exhibits from archaeological site.
