= Velo, Greece =

Velo Βέλο
- Municipal unit
- Location within the regional unit

- Location within Greece
- Coordinates: 37°58′N 22°47′E
- Country: Greece
- Administrative region: Peloponnese
- Regional unit: Corinthia
- Municipality: Velo-Vocha

Area
  - Municipal unit: 77.0 km^{2} (29.7 sq mi)
- Elevation: 20 m (66 ft)

Population (2021)
  - Municipal unit: 7,727
  - Municipal unit density: 100/km^{2} (260/sq mi)
  - Community: 2,997
- Time zone: UTC+2 (EET)
  - Summer (DST): UTC+3 (EEST)
- Postal code: 200 02
- Area code: 27420
- Vehicle registration: ΚΡ

Velo (Greek: Βέλο) is a town and a former municipality in Corinthia, Peloponnese, Greece. Since the 2011 local government reform it is part of the municipality Velo-Vocha, of which it is a municipal unit. The municipal unit has an area of 76.952 km^{2}. It is situated on the Gulf of Corinth coast, about 15 km west from Corinth, and 5 km southeast of Kiato. Greek National Road 8, the old Corinth-Patras highway, passes through the town.

The community has an elementary school, a secondary school, a semi-professional soccer team named Ellas Velou and a square called 'Liberty square'.

== Subdivisions ==
The municipal unit Velo is subdivided into the following communities (constituent villages in brackets):

- Velo (Velo, Sataiika)
- Ellinochori
- Kokkoni
- Krines
- Nerantza
- Poulitsa
- Stimagka
- Tarsina

== Historical population ==
Year	Town population	Municipality population
1981	949	-
1991	1,086	8,200
2001	3,041	8,211
2011	3,203	8,061
2021	2,997	7,727

== Notable people ==
- Stathis Psaltis, actor
- Alexis Kougias, lawyer
- Tryfon Papoutsis, actor

== See also ==
- List of settlements in Corinthia
