= Velo-Vocha =

Velo-Vocha Βέλο-Βόχα
- Municipality
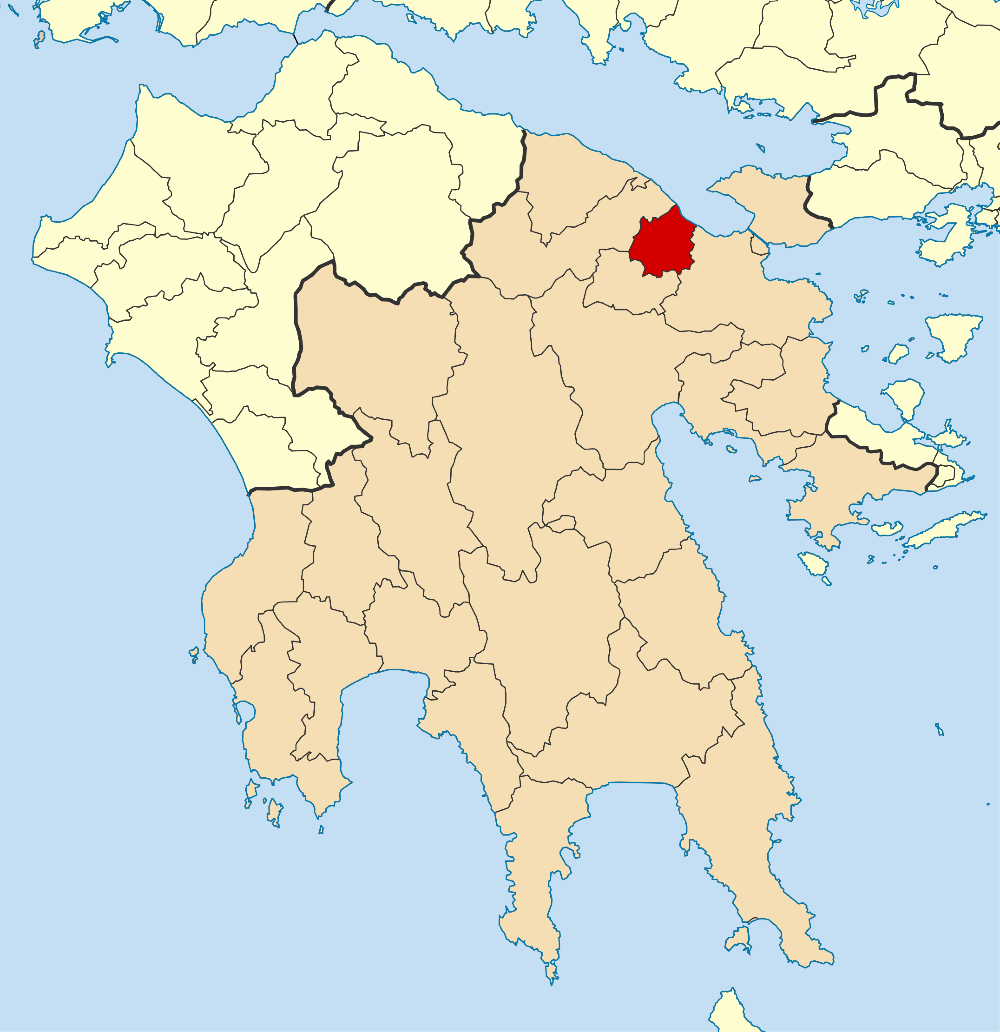

- Location within Greece
- Coordinates: 37°56′N 22°48′E
- Country: Greece
- Administrative region: Peloponnese
- Regional unit: Corinthia

Area
  - Municipality: 164.8 km^{2} (63.6 sq mi)

Population (2021)
  - Municipality: 17,883
  - Density: 108.5/km^{2} (281.0/sq mi)
- Time zone: UTC+2 (EET)
  - Summer (DST): UTC+3 (EEST)

Velo-Vocha (Greek: Βέλο-Βόχα) is a municipality in the Corinthia regional unit, Peloponnese, Greece. The seat of the municipality is the town Zevgolateio. The municipality has an area of 164.847 km^{2}.

== Municipality ==
The municipality Velo-Vocha was formed at the 2011 local government reform by the merger of the following 2 former municipalities, that became municipal units:

- Velo
- Vocha
