= Agioi Theodoroi =

Agioi Theodoroi Άγιοι Θεόδωροι
- Municipal unit
- Location within the regional unit

- Location within Greece
- Coordinates: 37°55′N 23°5′E
- Country: Greece
- Administrative region: Peloponnese
- Regional unit: Corinthia
- Municipality: Loutraki-Perachora-Agioi Theodoroi

Area
  - Municipal unit: 98.030 km^{2} (37.850 sq mi)
- Elevation: 1 m (3.3 ft)

Population (2021)
  - Municipal unit: 4,934
  - Municipal unit density: 50.33/km^{2} (130.4/sq mi)
- Time zone: UTC+2 (EET)
  - Summer (DST): UTC+3 (EEST)
- Postal code: 200 03
- Area code: 27410
- Vehicle registration: ΚΡ
- Website: agioitheodoroi.gov

Agioi Theodoroi (Greek: Άγιοι Θεόδωροι) is a town and a former municipality in Corinthia, Peloponnese, Greece. Since the 2011 local government reform, it is part of the municipality Loutraki-Perachora-Agioi Theodoroi, of which it is a municipal unit. The municipal unit has an area of 98.030 km^{2} (37.850 sq mi).

Agioi Theodoroi is located around 12 km (7.5 mi) east of Corinth and about 63 km (39 mi) west of Athens in the easternmost part of Corinthia. Its population was 4,643 inhabitants at the 2011 census. The well known "Pefkakia", an organized beach is in the eastern part of the town with many pine trees and golden sand. The west is bounded by the massive Corinth Refinery which is the country's largest industrial complex operated by Motor Oil Hellas with the Kalamaki hills and mountains dominating the northern part, and the Attica boundary with Kineta to its east. The municipality is bounded with Loutraki in the west and Megara in the east. Agriculture used to dominate before the 1960s and the 1970s. Now most of the agricultural land is in the north and the east. Some of the houses are summer homes. It has a beautiful pedestrian street by the sea. Many coffee shops, restaurants and beach bars are lining the sea front of the town. The central avenue of the town is part of the old Athens - Corinth highway. It has many shops and services, supermarkets, pharmacies, banks, restaurants etc. and two historical churches.

== History ==
Northwest of the town of Agioi Theodoroi, archaeologists unearthed the ruins of ancient Krommyon in 1961. Important discoveries included a statue of Apollo, numerous black-figure vases, and Geometric-period and pit graves. According to Strabo, the entire coastal region of the Saronic Gulf and the Gulf of Eleusis was known as Crommyonia. Until the 6th century BC, Krommyon belonged to Megara, after which it came under the control of Corinth.

There are two theories regarding the origin of the name Krommyon. According to the first, the name derives from the area's production of onions, while the second attributes it to Krommos, a son of Poseidon.

The area was also associated with the legend of Phaea, the fearsome sow killed by the mythical hero Theseus on his journey from Troezen to Athens.

Another significant discovery is a small circular area whose function remains uncertain. It may have served either as a place of worship or as the orchestra of a small theatre.

=== Historical population ===
Year	Population
1981	2,660
1991	5,084
2001	5,960
2011	4,643
2021	4,934

== Transportation ==
Agioi Theodoroi is served by the A8 motorway (Athens - Corinth - Patras) and a rail station of Proastiakos suburban railway connecting it directly to the city of Athens, to the Athens International Airport and Corinth. Also intercity buses between Athens and the Peloponnese stop here and tourist buses during the summer period.

== See also ==
- List of settlements in Corinthia
