= Leonard Russell (journalist) =

Leonard Russell (1906 – 1974) was an English journalist and satirist, known for editing Press Gang! Crazy World Chronicle (London 1937), a collection of satirical articles framed as real articles from British newspapers. Contributors included Russell, Cyril Connolly, Hilaire Belloc, Ronald Knox and A. G. Macdonnell.

The paper included a notable article by Connolly entitled 'Where Engels Fears to Tread': a mock book review which paints a brilliantly comic portrait of Brian Howard.

He married fellow journalist and film critic Dilys Powell in 1943. He had worked with The Daily Telegraph and The Sunday Times, as literary editor of the latter from 1944 until the mid-1960s. With Harold Hobson and Philip Knightley, he co-wrote a history of the paper:The Pearl of Days: an Intimate Memoir of the Sunday Times; published in 1972.

He died aged 68 in 1974.
