= Zevgolateio =

Zevgolateio Ζευγολατείο
- Community
- Location within Greece
- Coordinates: 37°56′N 22°48′E
- Country: Greece
- Administrative region: Peloponnese
- Regional unit: Corinthia
- Municipality: Velo-Vocha
- Municipal unit: Vocha

Population (2021)
  - Community: 4,269
- Time zone: UTC+2 (EET)
  - Summer (DST): UTC+3 (EEST)
- Postal code: 200 01
- Vehicle registration: ΚΡ

Zevgolateio (Greek: Ζευγολατείο, also Ζευγολατιό - Zevgolatio) is a town in the municipality Velo-Vocha, Corinthia, Greece. It is located 82 kilometers west of Athens. In 2021, the town had a population of 4,269. It is the seat of the municipality Velo-Vocha. The Zevgolatio railway station is served by trains between Athens and Kiato.
