= Vocha =

Vocha Βόχα
- Municipal unit
- Location within the regional unit

- Location within Greece
- Coordinates: 37°56′N 22°48′E
- Country: Greece
- Administrative region: Peloponnese
- Regional unit: Corinthia
- Municipality: Velo-Vocha

Area
  - Municipal unit: 87.9 km^{2} (33.9 sq mi)

Population (2021)
  - Municipal unit: 10,156
  - Municipal unit density: 116/km^{2} (299/sq mi)
- Time zone: UTC+2 (EET)
  - Summer (DST): UTC+3 (EEST)
- Vehicle registration: ΚΡ

Vocha (Greek: Βόχα) is a former municipality in Corinthia, Peloponnese, Greece. Since the 2011 local government reform it is part of the municipality Velo-Vocha, of which it is a municipal unit. The municipal unit has an area of 87.895 km^{2}. Population 10,156 (2021). The seat of the municipality was in Zevgolateio.
