= Phillip Knightley =

Australian journalist (1929–2016)

- Born: 23 January 1929; Sydney
- Died: 7 December 2016 (aged 87)
- Occupations: journalist, critic, and non-fiction author
- Spouse: married
- Children: 3 children: daughters, Aliya and Marisa & son Kim

Phillip George Knightley AM (23 January 1929 – 7 December 2016) was an Australian journalist, critic, and non-fiction author. He became a visiting Professor of Journalism at the University of Lincoln, England, and was a media commentator on the intelligence services and propaganda.

== Biography ==
Born in Sydney, he began his career in 1946 as a copyboy with the Sydney Daily Telegraph. Two years as a cadet reporter with The Northern Star (Lismore) followed. He then temporarily left journalism to become a copra trader in Fiji. He next joined the Oceania Daily News (Suva), for which he wrote a social column titled Round the Town With Suzanne. The paper prided itself on being the "First Paper Published in the World Today" because of Suva's proximity to the International Dateline.

Knightley returned to Australia and worked for The Herald in Melbourne interviewing newly arrived migrants at the docks. He returned to Sydney in 1952 joining the city's Daily Mirror as a crime reporter and covered Elizabeth II's visit to Australia in 1953/54. He left for London in November 1954 as foreign correspondent for the Daily Mirror, and then went to India as managing editor of the Bombay (Mumbai) literary magazine, Imprint. He learned much later that Imprint was funded by the CIA.

Migrating to the UK in 1963, he became a special correspondent for The Sunday Times of London, remaining there until 1985. During this time, he was a member of the 'Insight' investigative team. Over a three-year period from 1968 to 1971, Knightley prepared an investigative report about the development of thalidomide in Germany and its manufacture under licence by The Distillers Company in the UK without adequate testing. He also published an investigation into the Vestey family companies, which were structured to avoid tax. This resulted in a biography of the family titled The Rise and Fall of the House of Vestey in which he wrote that the family "did not live on the income; they did not live on the interest from their investments; they lived on the interest on the interest". Knightley was also at The Sunday Times during the Hitler Diaries scandal.

After leaving The Sunday Times, he contributed literary criticism to the Mail on Sunday (London), The Independent (London), The Australian's Review of Books, The Age (Melbourne), and the New York Review of Books.

He lectured on journalism, law, and war at the Australian National Press Club in Canberra, the Australian Senate, City University, London, University of Manchester, Pennsylvania State University, University of California Los Angeles, Stanford University, the Royal Military Academy Sandhurst, the Inner Temple, the International Committee of the Red Cross (ICRC), and to the University of Düsseldorf.

Knightley's main professional interests were war reporting, propaganda, and espionage. In more than 30 years of writing about espionage, he met most of the spy chiefs of all the major intelligence services in the world, and interviewed numerous officers and agents from all sides during the Cold War and since. In December 2010, he received media coverage for acting as a bail sureties provider for WikiLeaks founder Julian Assange. Having backed Assange by pledging bail in December 2010, Knightley lost the money in June 2012 when a judge ordered it to be forfeited, as Assange had sought to escape the jurisdiction of the English courts by entering the embassy of Ecuador.

In 1997, Knightley was a judge for Canada's Lionel Gelber Prize, which honours the world's best book on international relations. He was the European representative on the International Consortium of Investigative Journalists and patron of the C. W. Bean Foundation in Canberra. He was made a Member of the Order of Australia (AM) in the Queen's Birthday Honours in June 2005, for "services to journalism and as an author".

Knightley was married with two daughters, Aliya and Marisa, a son, Kim, and two granddaughters. He lived between London, Sydney and Goa in India. He died on 7 December 2016 at the age of 87.

== Awards and honours ==
- 1975 – Overseas Press Club of America, Best Book on Foreign Affairs 1975 for The First Casualty as the best book on foreign affairs.
- 1980 – British Press Awards Journalist of the Year
- 1980 – Granada Television 'What the papers say Reporter of the year'
- 1982 – British Colour Magazine Writer of the Year
- 1983 – British Chef and Brewer Crime Writer's award – for his investigation into a murder case in Italy
- 1988 – British Press Awards Journalist of the Year – one of only two journalists to have won the honour twice
- 2006 – City University, London, Artes Doctor Honoris Causa (Honorary Doctor of Arts) for Services to Journalism and Authorship
- 2007 – University of Lincoln, Lincoln, Visiting Professor of Journalism at the University of Lincoln
- 2007 – University of Sydney, Australia, Doctor Honoris Causa (Honorary Doctor of Letters) for Services to Journalism and Authorship.

== Publications ==
- The First Casualty: The War Correspondent as Hero, Propagandist, and Myth Maker from the Crimea to Vietnam, London, Andre Deutsch, 1975 – on war and propaganda (in the United States, a Book of the Month Club main choice), 465 pages. ISBN 0151312648
  - The First Casualty: The War Correspondent As Hero and Myth-Maker from the Crimea to Kosovo. Baltimore, MD: Johns Hopkins University Press, 2002. 592 pages. ISBN 080186951X
  - The First Casualty: The War Correspondent as Hero and Myth-Maker from the Crimea to Iraq. 3rd edition: 2004, 608 pages. ISBN 0801880300
- The Second Oldest Profession, 1986, on espionage (in the United States, a History Club alternative choice) ISBN 0393023869
- Philby, KGB Master Spy, his biography of Kim Philby ISBN 0394578902
- An Affair of State, about the 1963 John Profumo scandal in Britain, publication of which was banned in the United Kingdom
- The Secret Lives of Lawrence of Arabia (with Colin Simpson) OCLC 57525
- Philby – The Spy Who Betrayed a Generation. (with Bruce Page, David Leitch) 1968 Andre Deutsch Limited SBN 233 96014 7
- The Pearl of Days: An Intimate Memoir of the Sunday Times 1822-1972, (with Harold Hobson & Leonard Russell) London, Hamilton, 1972, ISBN 0241022665, the history of the Sunday Times
- Suffer the Children, about the Thalidomide tragedy
- The Death of Venice, ISBN 0275229203, on attempts to save Venice from permanent flooding
- The Rise and Fall of the House of Vestey, on the business empire established by Sir William (later Baron) Vestey in 1897;
- A Hack's Progress, London : J. Cape, 1997, ISBN 0224043994, his autobiography
- Australia: A Biography of a Nation, London : Jonathan Cape, 2000. ISBN 0224050060
- Knightley, Phillip, Sarah Jackson, and Annabel Merullo; John Keegan (Introduction). The Eye of War: Words and Photographs from the Front Line. Washington, DC: Smithsonian Books, 2003. ISBN 1588341658
