= Corinthia =

Corinthia Περιφερειακή ενότητα Κορινθίας
- Regional unit
- Municipalities of Corinthia

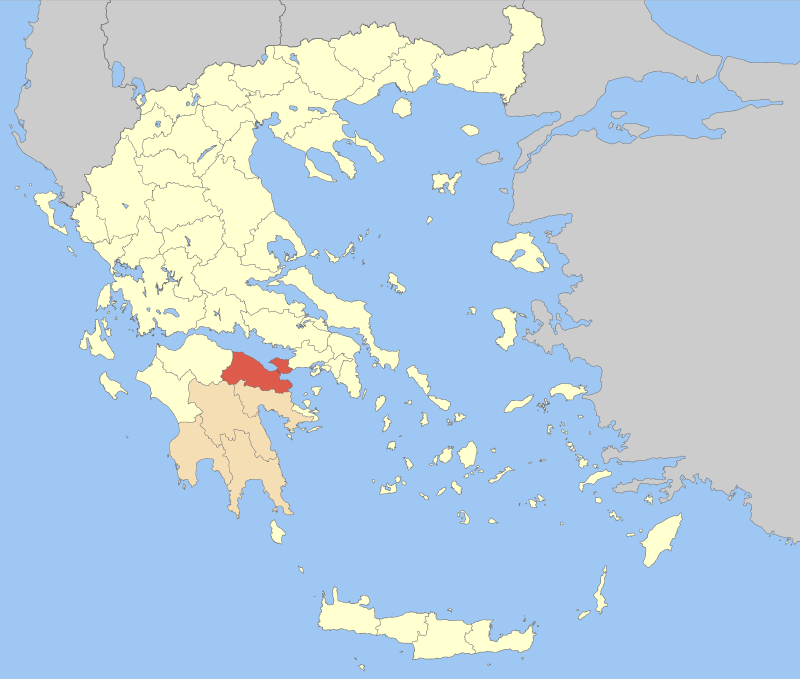
- Corinthia within Greece

- Location within Greece
- Coordinates: 37°57′N 22°50′E
- Country: Greece
- Administrative region: Peloponnese
- Seat: Corinth

Area
  - Total: 2,290 km^{2} (880 sq mi)

Population (2021)
  - Total: 138,310
  - Density: 60.4/km^{2} (156/sq mi)
- Time zone: UTC+2 (EET)
  - Summer (DST): UTC+3 (EEST)
- Postal code: 20x xx
- Area code: 274x0
- Vehicle registration: ΚΡ

Corinthia (Greek: Κορινθία, romanized: Korinthía; Modern Greek pronunciation: [korinˈθia]) is one of the regional units of Greece. It is part of the region of the Peloponnese. It is situated around the city of Corinth, in the north-eastern part of the Peloponnese peninsula.

== Geography ==
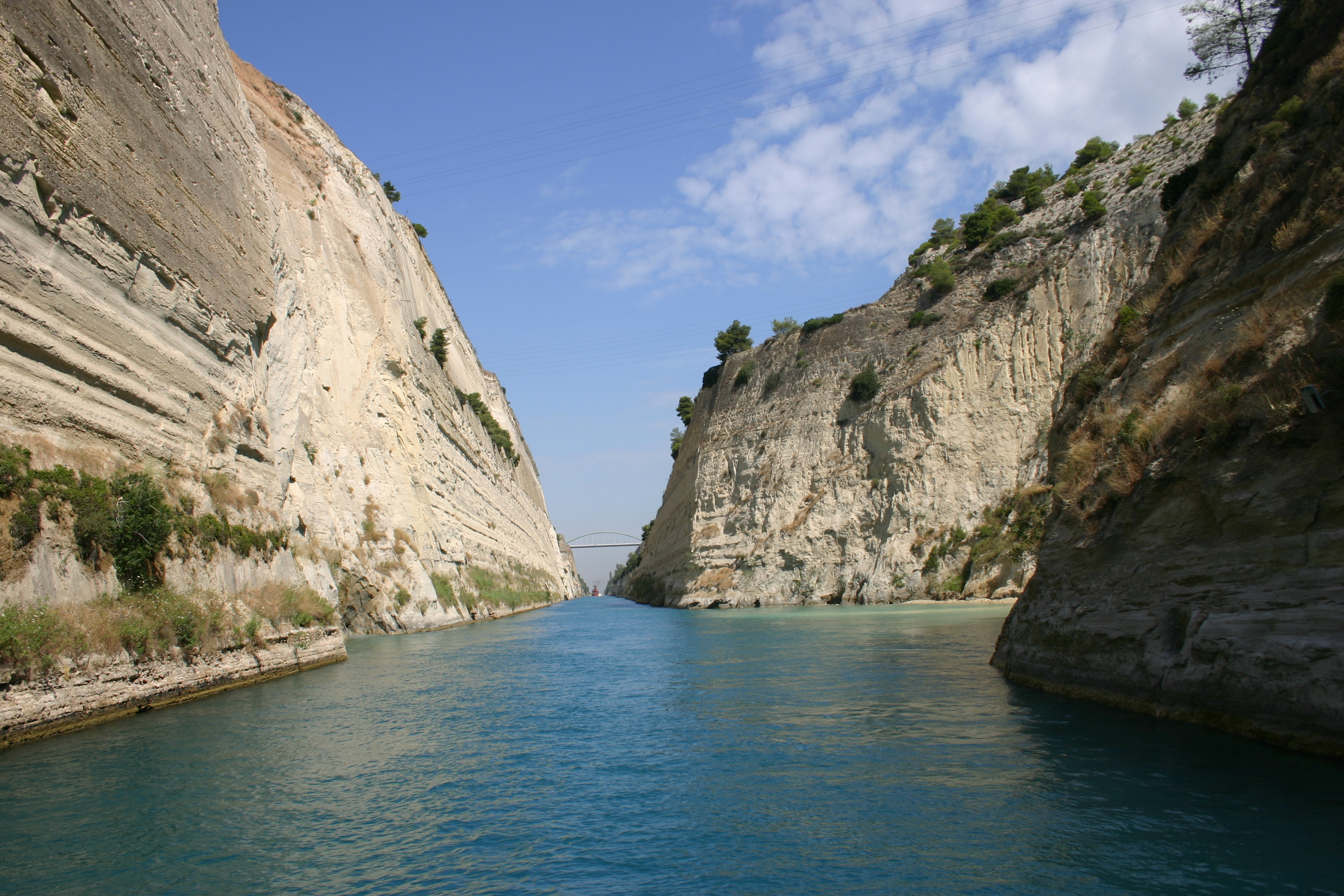
View of the Corinth Canal

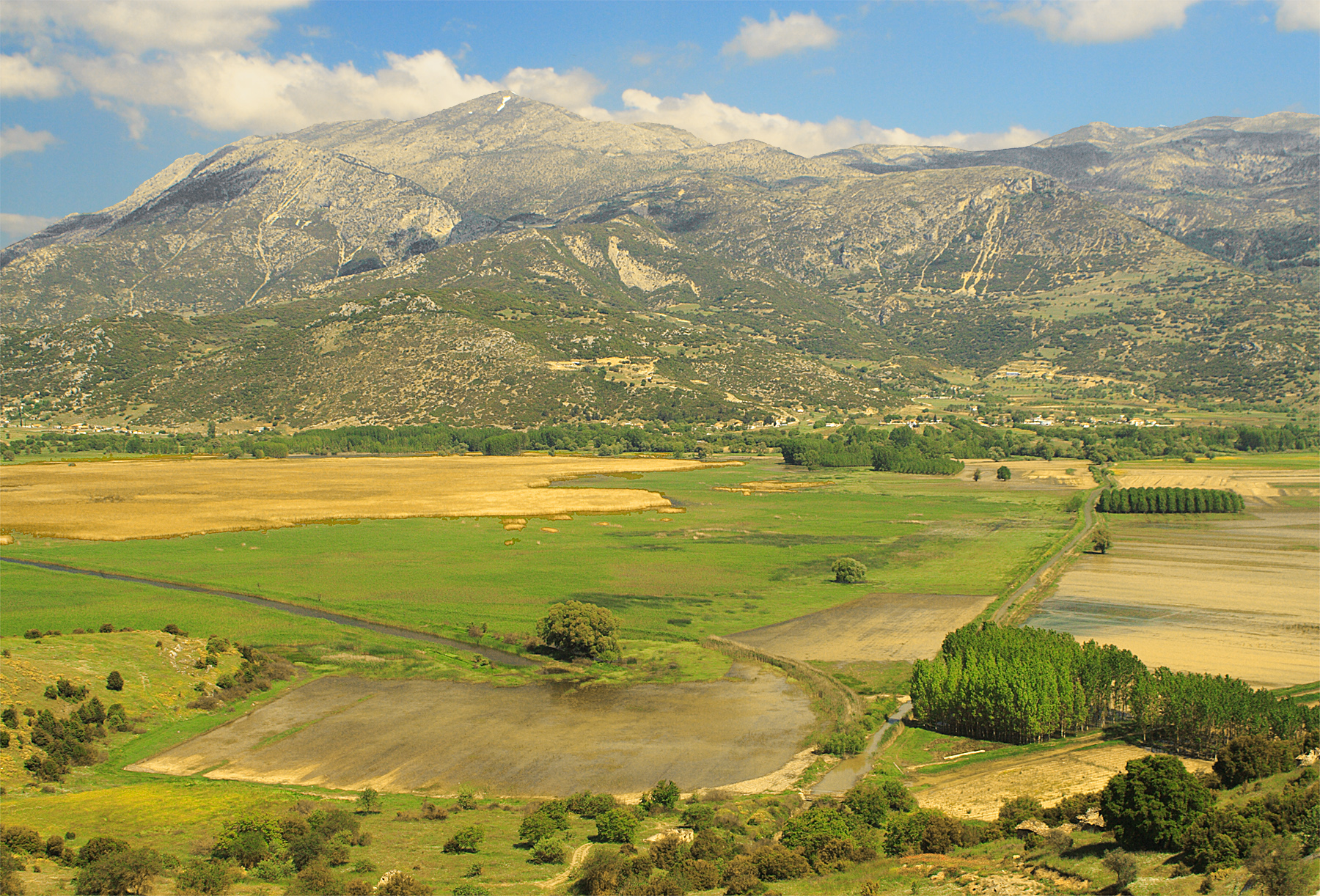
Landscape of Stymfalia with Mount Kyllini

Corinthia borders on Achaea to the west and southwest, the Gulf of Corinth and Attica to the north, the Saronic Gulf to the east, Argolis to the south and Arcadia to the southwest. The Corinth Canal, carrying ship traffic between the Ionian and the Aegean seas, is about 4 km (2.5 miles) east of Corinth, cutting through the Isthmus of Corinth. Corinthia is increasingly seen as part of the wider metropolitan area of Athens, with municipalities, such as Agioi Theodoroi in the easternmost part of the regional unit, being considered suburbs of Athens. The area around Corinth and the western Saronic including the southeastern part are made up of fault lines including the Corinth Fault, the Poseidon Fault and a fault running from Perahcora to Agioi Theodoroi. More faults are near Kiras Vrysi and Sofiko. The eastern coastlands of Corinthia are made up of pastures and farmlands where olives, grapes, tomatoes and vegetables are cultivated. The rest of Corinthia is mountainous. Its tallest mountain is Kyllini in its west and the largest lake is Lake Stymphalos, (important in Greek mythology and a bird resort, protected by Natura 2000) situated in the southwest. The reservoir will become one of the largest lakes after its completion. The climate of Corinthia consists of hot summers and mild winters in the coastal areas and somewhat colder winters with occasional snowfalls in the mountainous areas.

== Administration ==
The regional unit Corinthia is subdivided into six municipalities. These are (number as in the map in the infobox):

- Corinth (Korinthos, 1)
- Loutraki-Perachora-Agioi Theodoroi (3)
- Nemea (4)
- Sikyona (6)
- Velo-Vocha (2)
- Xylokastro-Evrostina (5)

=== Prefecture ===
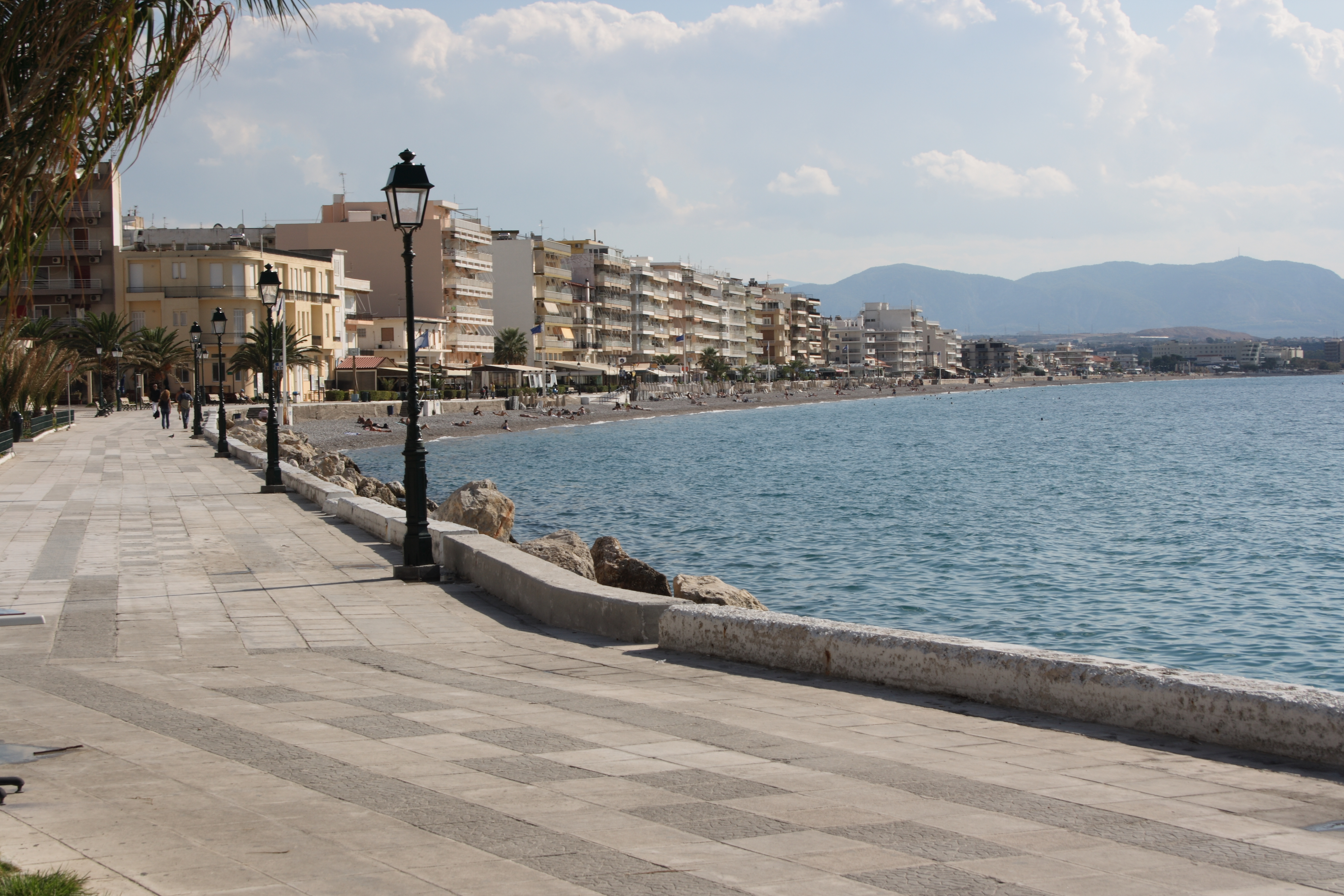
Loutraki

As a part of the 2011 Kallikratis government reform, the regional unit Corinthia was created out of the former prefecture Corinthia (Greek: Νομός Κορινθίας). The prefecture had the same territory as the present regional unit. At the same time, the municipalities were reorganised, according to the table below.

New municipality	Old municipalities	Seat
Corinth (Korinthos)	Assos-Lechaio	Corinth
Corinth (Korinthos)	Corinth	Corinth
Corinth (Korinthos)	Saronikos	Corinth
Corinth (Korinthos)	Solygeia	Corinth
Corinth (Korinthos)	Tenea	Corinth
Loutraki-Perachora-Agioi Theodoroi	Agioi Theodoroi	Loutraki
Loutraki-Perachora-Agioi Theodoroi	Loutraki-Perachora	Loutraki
Nemea	Nemea	Nemea
Sikyona	Feneos	Kiato
Sikyona	Sikyona	Kiato
Sikyona	Stymfalia	Kiato
Velo-Vocha	Velo	Zevgolateio
Velo-Vocha	Vocha	Zevgolateio
Xylokastro-Evrostina	Evrostina	Xylokastro
Xylokastro-Evrostina	Xylokastro	Xylokastro

== Population ==
Most of the modern inhabitants of the Corinthia are descendants of Arvanites. Large concentrations of those descendants live especially in mountainous regions, including Xylokeriza, Examilia, Sophiko and Kyras Vryse.

Historical population
Year	Pop.	±%
1991	132,238	—
2001	144,527	+9.3%
2011	145,082	+0.4%
2021	138,310	−4.7%

=== Main towns and cities ===
The main cities and towns of Corinthia are (ranked by 2021 census population):

- Corinth 30,816
- Loutraki 12,212
- Kiato 9,907
- Xylokastro 5,378

== History ==
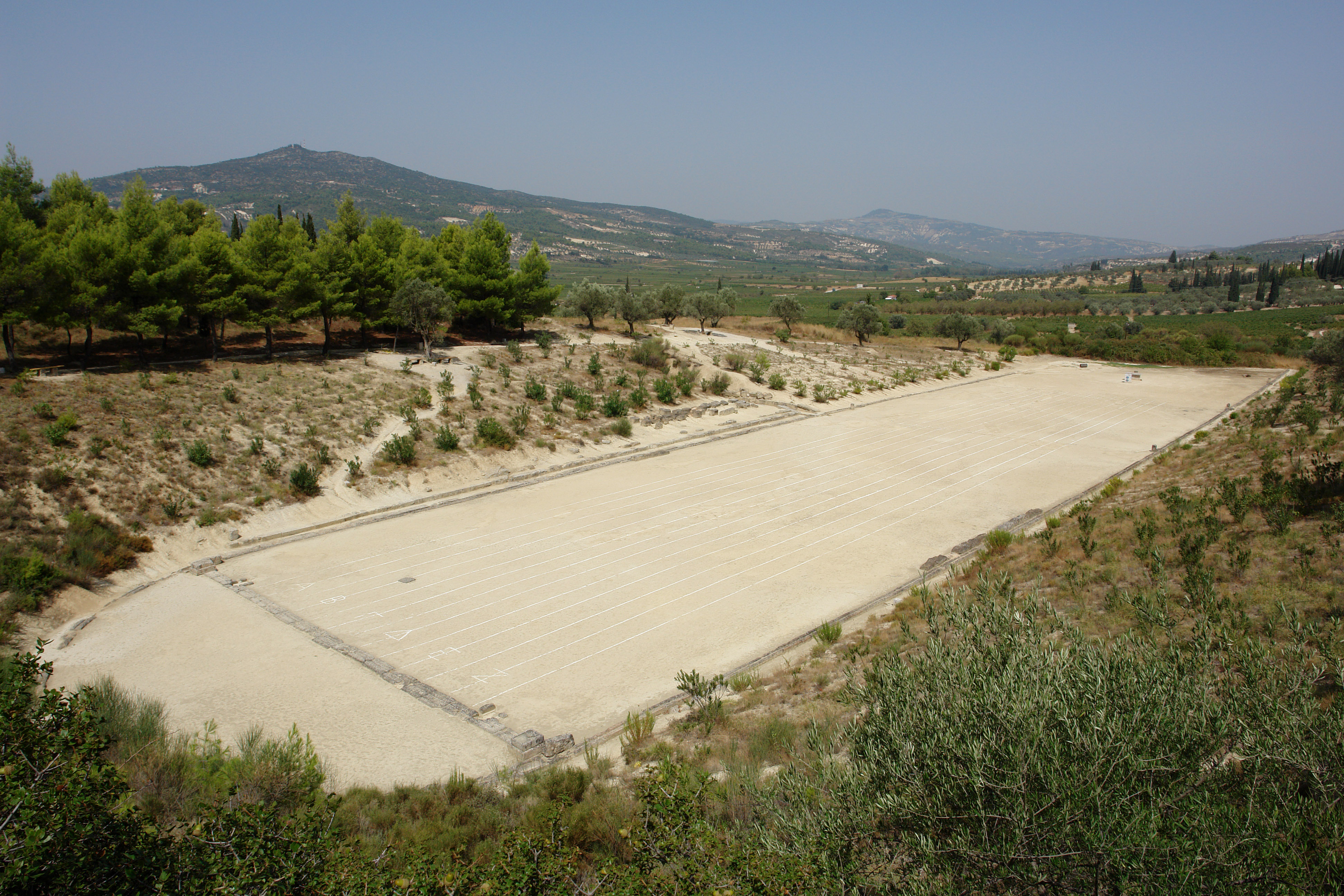
The ancient stadion of Nemea

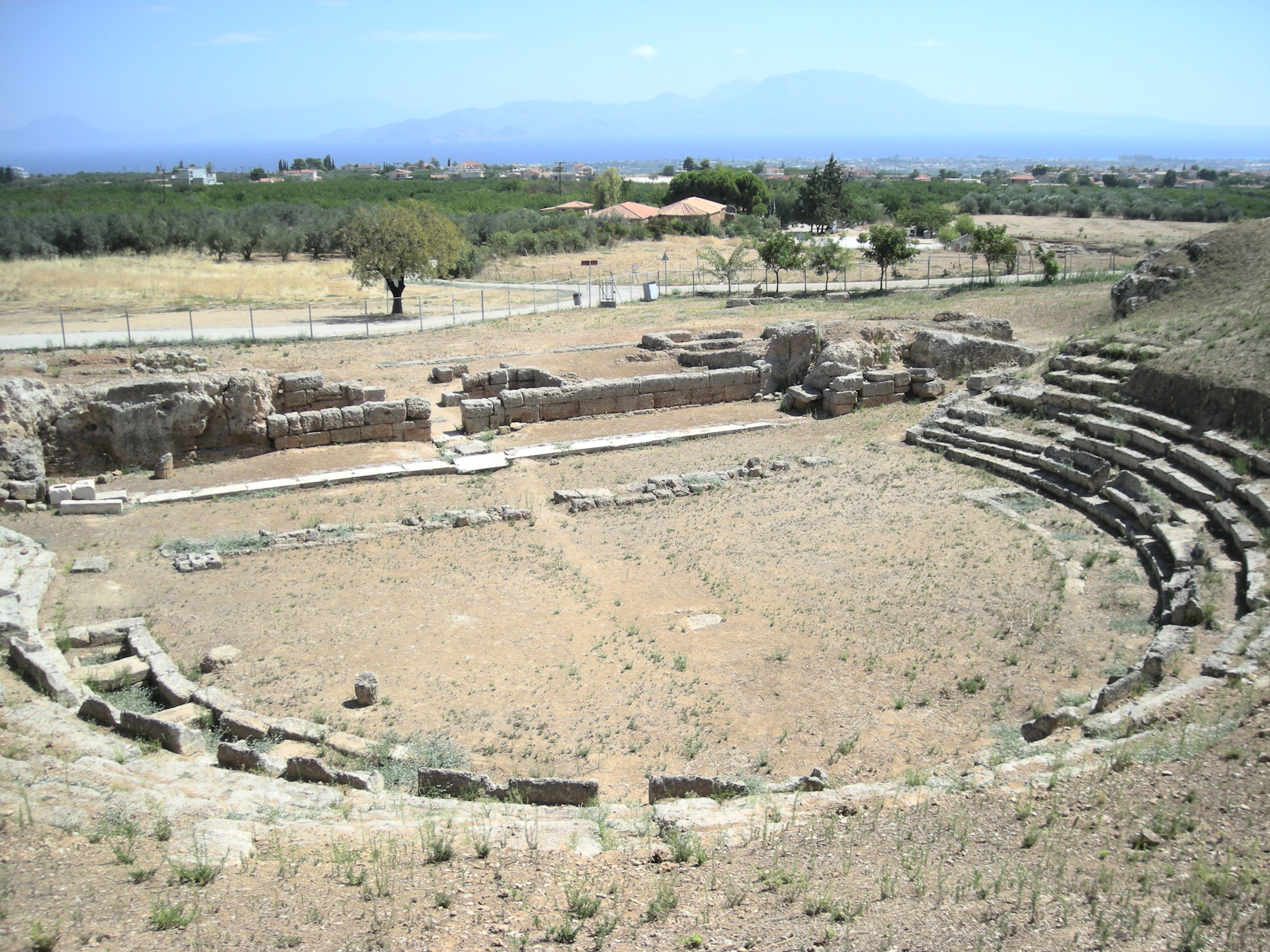
The ancient theatre of Sicyon

From 1833 to 1899, the Corinthia prefecture included Argolis and was known as Argolidocorinthia. It included Hydra, Spetses and Kythira. Argolis joined Corinthia to reform Argolidocorinthia again in 1909. Forty years later, in 1949, the prefecture was finally separated from Argolis.

The highway was first paved at the turn of the 20th century. The mid to late-20th century saw the population shifting from agriculture to other jobs, as people migrated to larger towns and cities as well as other parts of the world. In the 1960s, the EO8a road (now mostly replaced by the A8 motorway) was constructed to handle the increasing traffic between Corinth and Athens and allow higher speed limits (60 to 80 km/h (37 to 50 mph)). The section from the old Corinth interchange eastward in Corinthia was opened in 1962 and the section west of Corinth was added in 1969. The new highway had a significant effect on the local industry, as it lowered the cost of transportation of goods between Corinthia and the Athens metropolitan area.

In late 2006, the prefect of Corinthia announced the construction of a new dam, to be located 5 to 7 km (3.1 to 4.3 miles) south of Kiato and Sicyon, near Stimanika, over the Elissos River. It will be the second largest body of water (lakes, reservoirs) in Corinthia. The dam will be designed to withstand earthquakes and natural disasters, including flooding. On July 17, 2007, a forest fire struck the area around the historic Acrocorinth and its castle.

== Economy ==
The main sources of income are goods and services, manufacturing, tourism and agriculture.

== Transport ==
The Athens Airport–Patras railway, which replaced the metre-gauge Piraeus–Patras railway, runs along the coast of Corinthia, crossing the Corinth Canal at Galota, near Isthmia: Corinth and Kiato are the main train stations in the regional unit.

The main roads in the regional unit include the A8 (Olympia Odos) and A7 motorway, as well as the EO7, EO8, EO8a (which bypasses Corinth to the south), EO10, and EO66 national roads.

== Communications ==
- Top Channel – Corinth

== Culture ==
Notable attractions include Ancient Corinth with its acropolis, Acrocorinth, the Corinth Canal, the thermal springs of Loutraki, the archaeological sites of Nemea, Sicyon and the Heraion of Perachora.

== See also ==
- List of settlements in Corinthia
