= Heraion of Perachora =

Ancient Greek temple

- Ηραίο Περαχώρας (Greek)
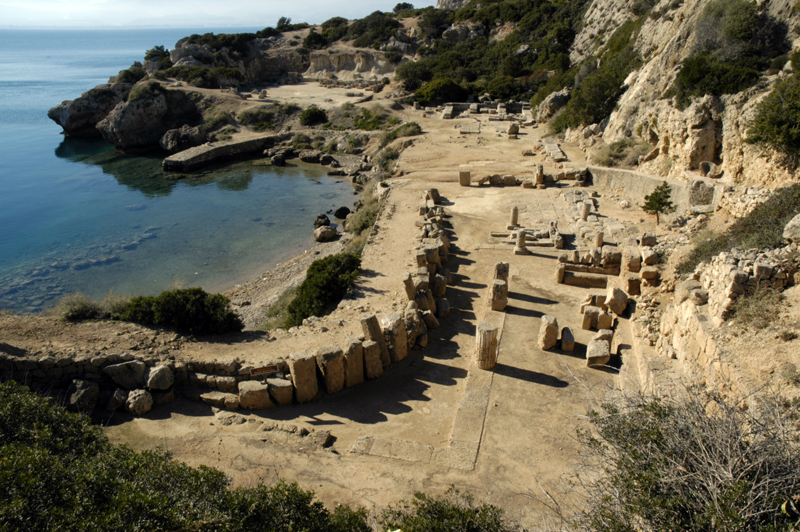
- Overview of the lower sanctuary looking west with the L-shaped stoa in foreground and the temple of Hera Akraia in the distance at right and the West Court in the distance at left.

- Location within Greece
- 38°01′41″N 22°51′09″E
- Type: Sanctuary
- Periods: Greek Dark Ages to Hellenistic
- Satellite of: Corinth
- Location: Limni Vouliagmenis, Corinthia, Greece
- Region: Corinthia

The Heraion of Perachora (Greek: Ηραίο Περαχώρας) is a sanctuary of the goddess Hera situated in a small cove of the Corinthian Gulf at the end of the Perachora peninsula. In addition to a temple of Hera of unusual construction and antiquity, remains of several other structures have also been found, including an L-shaped stoa, a large cistern, dining rooms, and a second potential temple. The Sanctuary of Hera at Perachora is 14.2 kilometres (8.8 mi) northwest of Corinth and 75.9 kilometres (47.2 mi) west of Athens. Although there is debate between Argos, Megara and Corinth, the sanctuary was probably under the control of Corinth, as it faced the harbors of that powerful city across the Corinthian Gulf. Cult activity at the site continued from perhaps the 9th century BC to 146 BC, when the Roman general Mummius sacked Corinth during the war with the Achaean League. In the Roman period, domestic structures were built on the site, indicating that the area was no longer a sanctuary. This site is significant for the study of the origins of Greek temple architecture and rural cults.

== Mythology and history ==
There is a legend recounted in Euripides that Medea buried her murdered children at a sanctuary of Hera Akraia as she fled from Corinth. This may be a reference to this site. Herodotus tells the story of Periander stripping the clothes off of the Corinthian women at a sanctuary of Hera.

The Greek historian Strabo wrote in the 1st century CE that there was an oracle associated with the sanctuary.

If the temple was still in use by the 4th-century, it would have been closed during the persecution of pagans in the late Roman Empire, when laws against non-Christian religions and their sanctuaries were enacted by the Christian emperors.

== Archaeology ==
Map of the archaeological site.: 1. West court; 2. Roman house; 3. Apsidal structure; 4. Temple of Hera Akraia; 5. Altar; 6. L-shaped stoa; 7. Apsidal cistern; 8. Dining rooms; 9. Water channels; 10. Sacred pool; 11. Temple of Hera Limanaia; 12. Walls; 13. Modern jetty; 14. Modern chapel; 15. Modern footpath

The known structures of the sanctuary cover a rectangle approximately 45 metres (148 ft) north–south and 245 metres (804 ft) east–west. The sanctuary wrapped around a small cove and extended toward the east uphill along a ridge. The structures will be discussed in order from west to east.

=== West court ===
At the extreme southwest end of the sanctuary, there is a polygonal area of roughly 25 by 25 metres (82 by 82 ft) largely cut into the rock beside the cove. This structure has been variously termed the agora, or the west court. This structure may date to the 6th century BC and thus be contemporary with the Temple of Hera Akraia. It appears to have been destroyed in the 4th century BC; it has been proposed that the L-shaped stoa took over its function. There appear to have been colonnades on the western and southern sides. There are remains of a house from the Roman period roughly at the center of the area.

=== Apsidal structure and temple of Hera Akraia ===
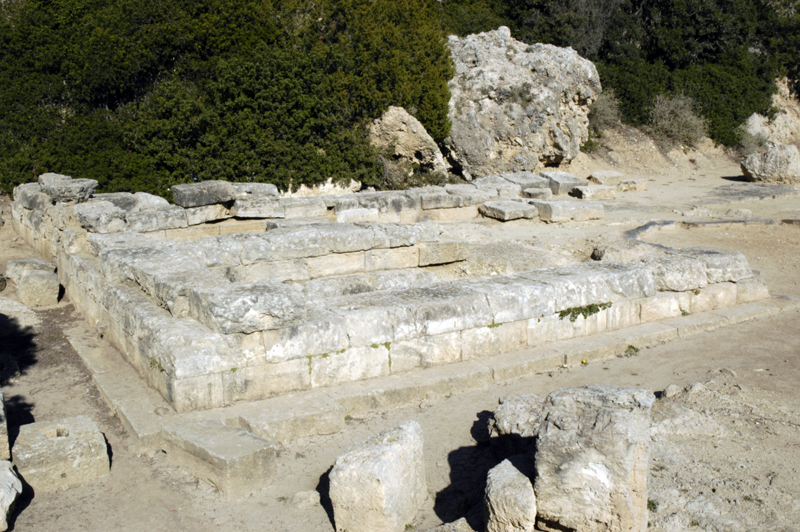
The western end of the 6th century BC Temple of Hera Akraia showing the three aisles.

The earliest structure at the site was an apsidal building of perhaps the late 9th century BC, which is thought to resemble the house-temple models known from the Argive Heraion. On that analogy, it would have had a high-peaked roof, covered perhaps in thatch. There were Early Helladic sherds under this structure.

In the 6th century BC, a Doric order tetrastyle-prostyle temple of about 10 by 30 metres (33 by 98 ft) was built a little to the west of the apsidal structure. The epithet Akraia refers to the position of the sanctuary at the point of the peninsula. The cella of this temple was divided into three aisles – a highly unusual design. There was a wall to divide the west end of the cella and a screen in front of the cult statue. Evidence for the reuse of some blocks may indicate that there was a prior phase of the structure in the 7th century BC. The roof of this temple was of marble. No evidence has yet been found of pedimental sculptures.

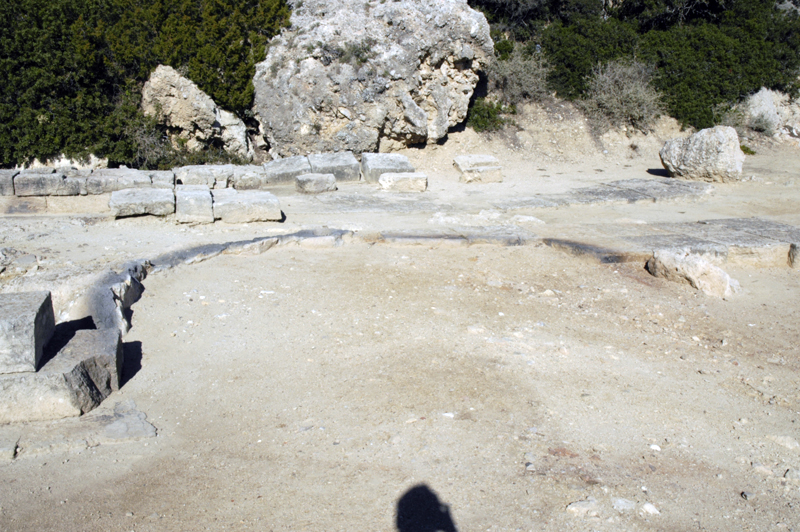
The lime kiln in the 6th century BC temple

The Doric order triglyph and metope frieze may have only extended along the eastern face, as few of the elements of this survive. The metopes were about 15 centimetres (6 in) thick and slotted into the triglyph blocks rather than forming a single block with them, as is more typical. Roughly in the center of the southern side of the temple was a limekiln of about 4.5 metres (15 ft) in diameter that was used to reduce the marble of the temple (and of the sanctuary generally) into lime for the construction of the Hexamilion wall across the Isthmus of Corinth in the 5th century AD. Scorch mark remain visible on the stones of the temple around a circular area where the heat of the limekiln caused the breakdown of the underlying stones.

=== Triglyph and metope altar ===
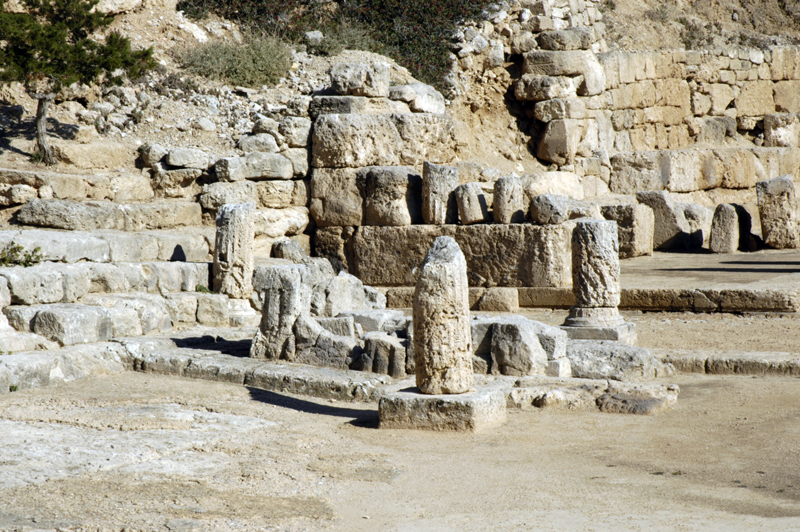
The triglyph and metope altar from the south; beyond the altar is the western end of the L-shaped stoa.

About 15 metres (49 ft) east of the Temple of Hera Akraia, there was a stone altar decorated with a triglyph and metope frieze dating from the early 4th century BC. This altar measured about 2.5 by 4 metres (8.2 by 13.1 ft). In the late 4th century BC Ionic columns were added to the corners, perhaps for a canopy.

=== L-shaped stoa ===
Immediately east of the altar was a two-storied stoa with an L-shaped plan, also thought to date to the late 4th century BC. The eastern arm of the stoa was about 16.5 metres (54 ft) north to south and about 5.5 metres (18 ft) deep, while the northern arm of the stoa was about 17.5 metres (57 ft) east to west and about 5 metres (16 ft) deep. The lower level employed an external colonnade of the Doric order, while the upper floor used the Ionic order. This is the first known example of this combination. The stairs to the second floor are not preserved. A water channel extended to this structure from the hydraulic system east of the sanctuary.

=== Double-apsidal cistern ===
Around 35 metres (115 ft) east of the L-shaped stoa, there was a cistern of about 6 by 21 metres (20 by 69 ft) with each end rounded into an apsidal shape. Stone internal piers supported the vaults for the roof. On the eastern end of the structure there was a settling tank of about 3 by 5 metres (10 by 16 ft). About 10 metres (33 ft) to the northeast of the settling tank there was a diversion point in the water channel with one branch directed to the cistern and the other to the L-shaped stoa. The excavator dates the cistern to within the 6th–4th centuries BC.

=== Dining rooms ===
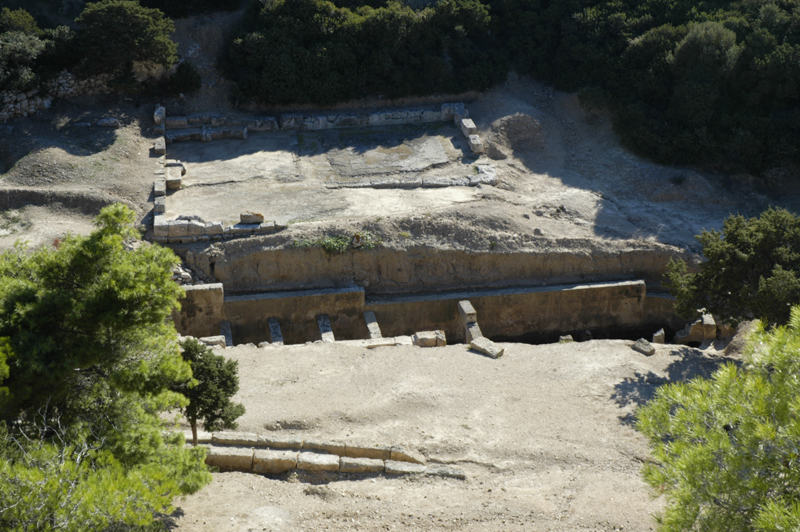
View south over the water channel, the double-apsidal cistern, and the dining rooms.

Immediately south of the cistern was a double dining room, probably associated with the cult activity at the site. This structure was initially identified as a Hellenistic house, but the cuttings for the legs of the dining couches make the identification as a dining room secure. Tomlinson proposes before 490 BC as the date for this structure.

=== Sacred pool ===
Around 30 metres (98 ft) east of the cistern, was a pool about 2 metres (7 ft) deep thought to perhaps have a sacred function within the cult. Significant numbers of mesomphalic phialai (libation vessels) were found within this structure. This structure is now backfilled and its exact location unknown.

The "Sacred Pool" features prominently in an effort by Tomlinson to reconstruct oracular practice at Perachora. He connected the phialai to divinatory practices and speculated that a ritual involving casting the phialai into the "Sacred Pool" would forecast good voyages for sailors stopping at Perachora after departing from Lechaion. Subsequent scholarship has not accepted this theory and Tomlinson views the pool as a simple reservoir.

=== Temple of Hera Limenaia ===
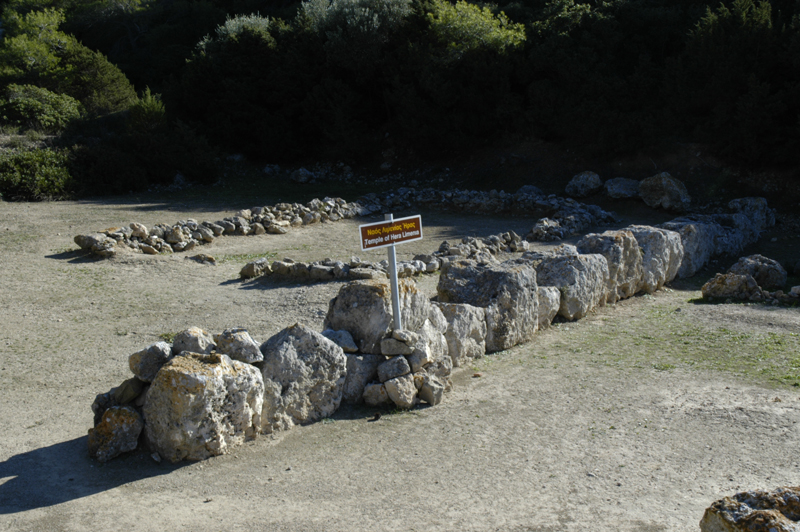
The temple (?) of Hera Limenaia, looking SE.

Around 75 metres (246 ft) east of the cistern lie the remains of a structure that dates perhaps to the 6th century BC. During excavation a bronze bull was discovered, inscribed with Sikyonian letters and dating to the end of the 6th century BC. There was a hearth at the centre of the building. It may have been a house-temple or a dining room, as evidenced by spits for roasting meat found inside. Many diagrams and reconstructions of this structure show a door in the western side-wall; the gap in the stones, however, may have been created by a trial trench dug by an earlier excavator.

The "Temple of Hera Limenaia" was named by the original excavator, Payne, on the basis of an apparent inscribed dedication to "Hera Limenaia." For some time, scholars supposed that two separate cult centers existed at Perachora. John Salmon, inter alia, has argued convincingly that Hera's cult title at Perachora was Akraia, while Limenaia was a secondary epithet. More recently, Blanche Menadier has compared the epithet Limenaia to the Homeric epithet Leukolenos, also attested epigraphically at Perachora.

== Remains outside the sanctuary ==
Remains are known to extend for 1.7 kilometres (1.1 mi) eastward from the sanctuary to a lagoon. The best preserved of these constitute an extensive hydraulic system.

=== Rock-cut cisterns ===
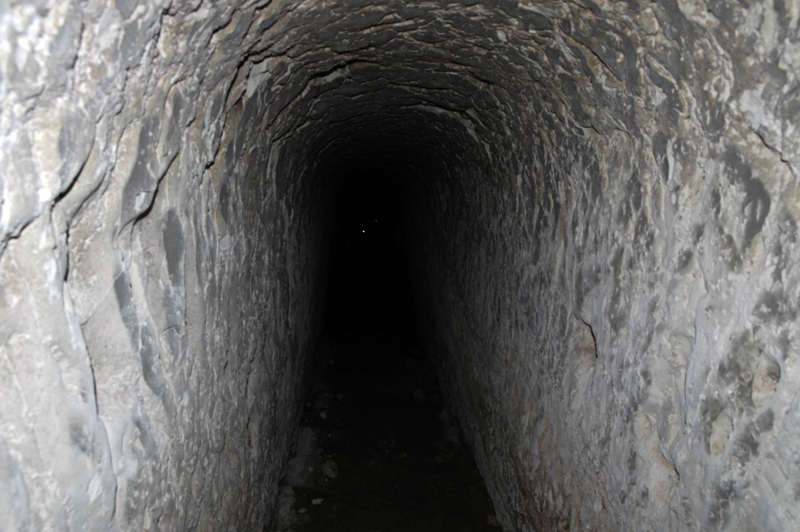
The stairway down into the upper rock-cut cisterns.

About 750 metres (2,460 ft) east-northeast of the sanctuary, there was a series of massive cisterns, reached by a rock-cut stairway extending about 50 metres (160 ft) down into the bedrock. The opening of the stairway is 64 metres (210 ft) northwest of the openings of the cisterns. The descent is steep and the steps are not all well-preserved. There are cuttings for a parapet wall around the vertiginous upper openings of the cisterns to prevent falls. It has been proposed that the water was raised from the cisterns to the water channel by the use of large human-powered waterwheels.

=== Fountain house ===
About 540 metres (1,770 ft) east-northeast of the sanctuary, there was a hexastyle-prostyle fountain house (having six columns in its facade). Behind the facade there were three rock-cut basins, similar to the Pirene fountain house at Corinth. This structure was later incorporated into a rural villa in the Roman period. This fountain house is thought to date to the same time as the L-shaped stoa, which is the ultimate destination of the water of the system.

=== Aqueduct ===
Water channels join the upper cisterns to the fountain house and the fountain house to the cistern of the sanctuary and the L-shaped stoa. At intervals there were settling basins along the water conduit, including one immediately above the fountain house.

== Significance of the site ==
As is the case for the rural sanctuary of Artemis at Brauron in relation to the religion of Athens, the sanctuary of Hera at Perachora is important for the study of rural cult in the Corinthia. The unusual plan of the 6th century BCE temple of Hera Akraia coupled with its location on the remains of a 9th century BCE apsidal structure are of interest to the study of the development of the Greek temple as an architectural and cultic form. While it has been proposed that the cult of Hera Akraia had chthonic elements, this idea has not been generally accepted. The reference in Strabo to an oracle may fit with the idea that the children of Medea were buried at the site, and thus explain any chthonic elements to the cult as pertaining to a heroon.

== Images of the sanctuary of Hera at Perachora ==
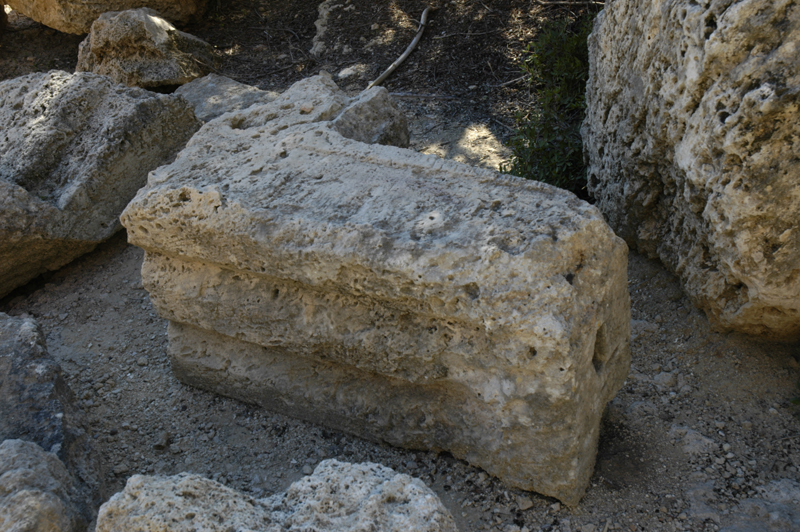
A triglyph of the Temple of Hera Akraia showing the slots for inserting the metope.

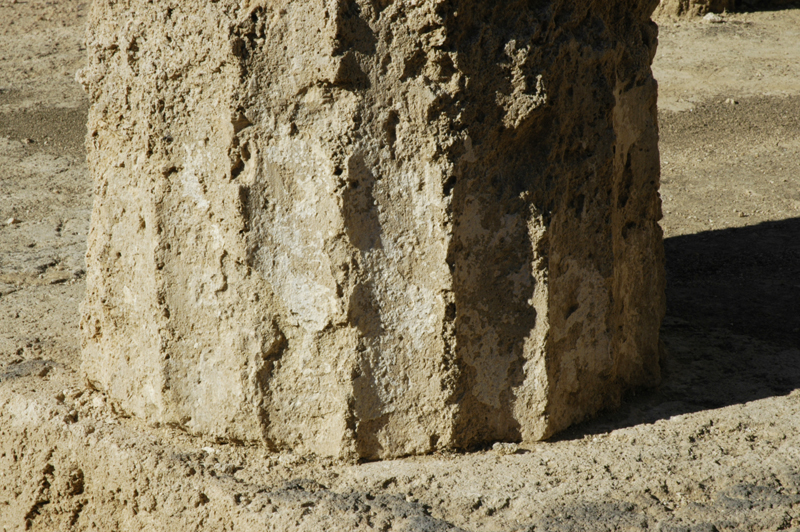
A Doric column drum from the L-shaped stoa resting on the stylobate; plaster is visible.

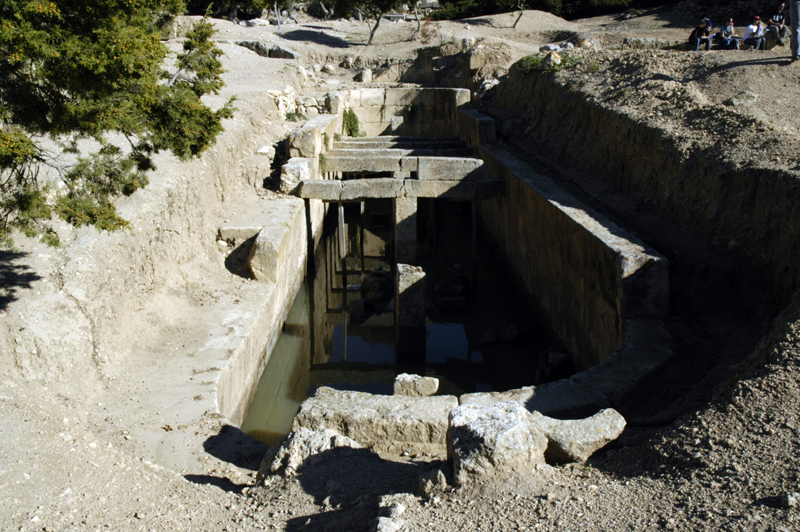
The double-apsidal cistern of the sanctuary.

== See also ==
- Heraion of Argos

== Ancient sources ==
- Euripides, Medea 1378–1383
- Herodotus 5.92
- Xenophon, Hellenica IV.5
- Livy XXXII.23
- Plutarch Q.G. 17
- Plutarch, Life of Kleomenes III.814
- Strabo 8.6.22
