= Loutraki-Perachora-Agioi Theodoroi =

Loutraki-Perachora-Agioi Theodoroi Λουτράκι-Περαχώρα-Άγιοι Θεόδωροι
- Municipality
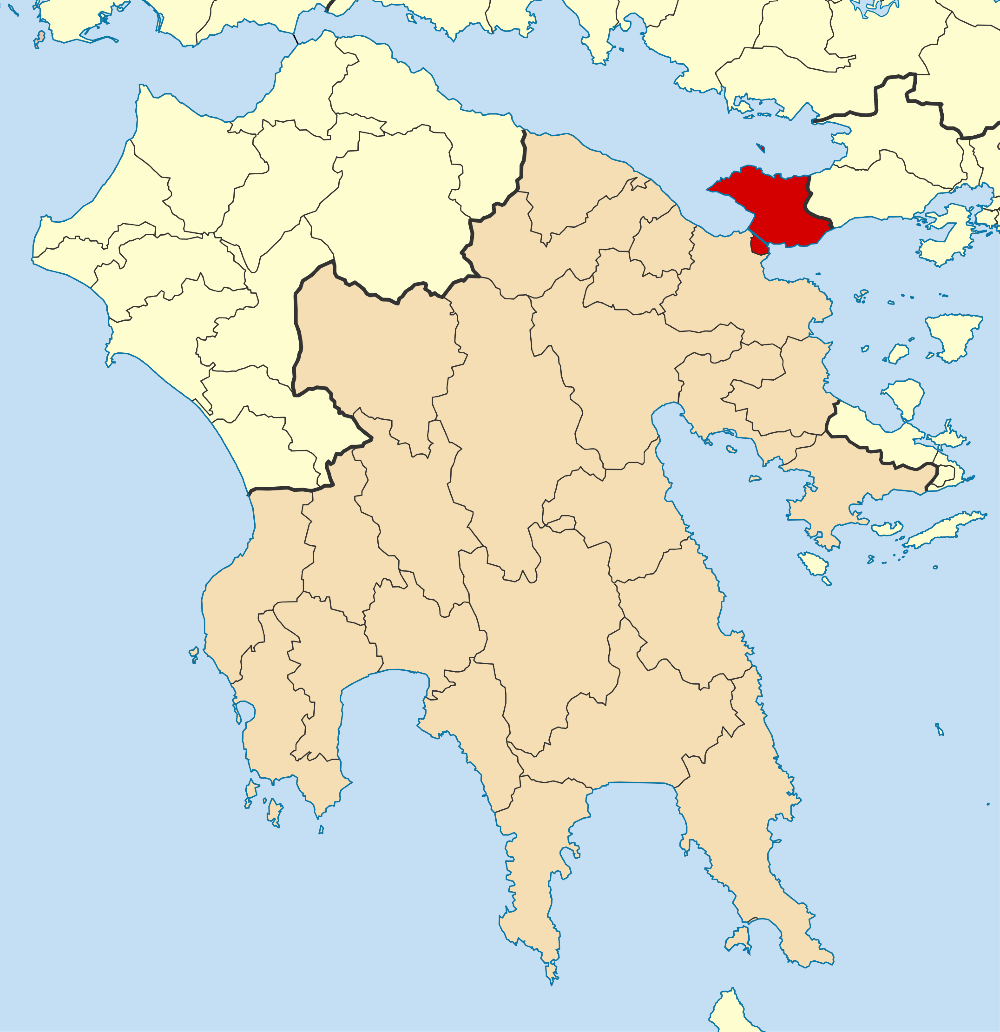

- Location within Greece
- Coordinates: 37°58′N 22°59′E
- Country: Greece
- Administrative region: Peloponnese
- Regional unit: Corinthia
- Seat: Loutraki

Government
  - Mayor: Georgios Gkionis (since 2014)

Area
  - Municipality: 294.9 km^{2} (113.9 sq mi)

Population (2021)
  - Municipality: 22,016
  - Density: 74.66/km^{2} (193.4/sq mi)
- Time zone: UTC+2 (EET)
  - Summer (DST): UTC+3 (EEST)
- Website: loutraki.gov.gr

Loutraki-Perachora-Agioi Theodoroi (Greek: Λουτράκι-Περαχώρα-Άγιοι Θεόδωροι) is a municipality in the Corinthia regional unit, Peloponnese, Greece. The seat of the municipality is the town Loutraki. The municipality has an area of 294.90 km^{2}.

The municipality was formed at the 2011 local government reform by the merger of the former municipalities Agioi Theodoroi and Loutraki-Perachora, that became municipal units. Initially named Loutraki-Agioi Theodoroi, in January 2014 the municipality was renamed Loutraki-Perachora-Agioi Theodoroi.
