= Isthmus of Corinth =

Land bridge located between the Peloponnese peninsula and mainland Greece

- Isthmus
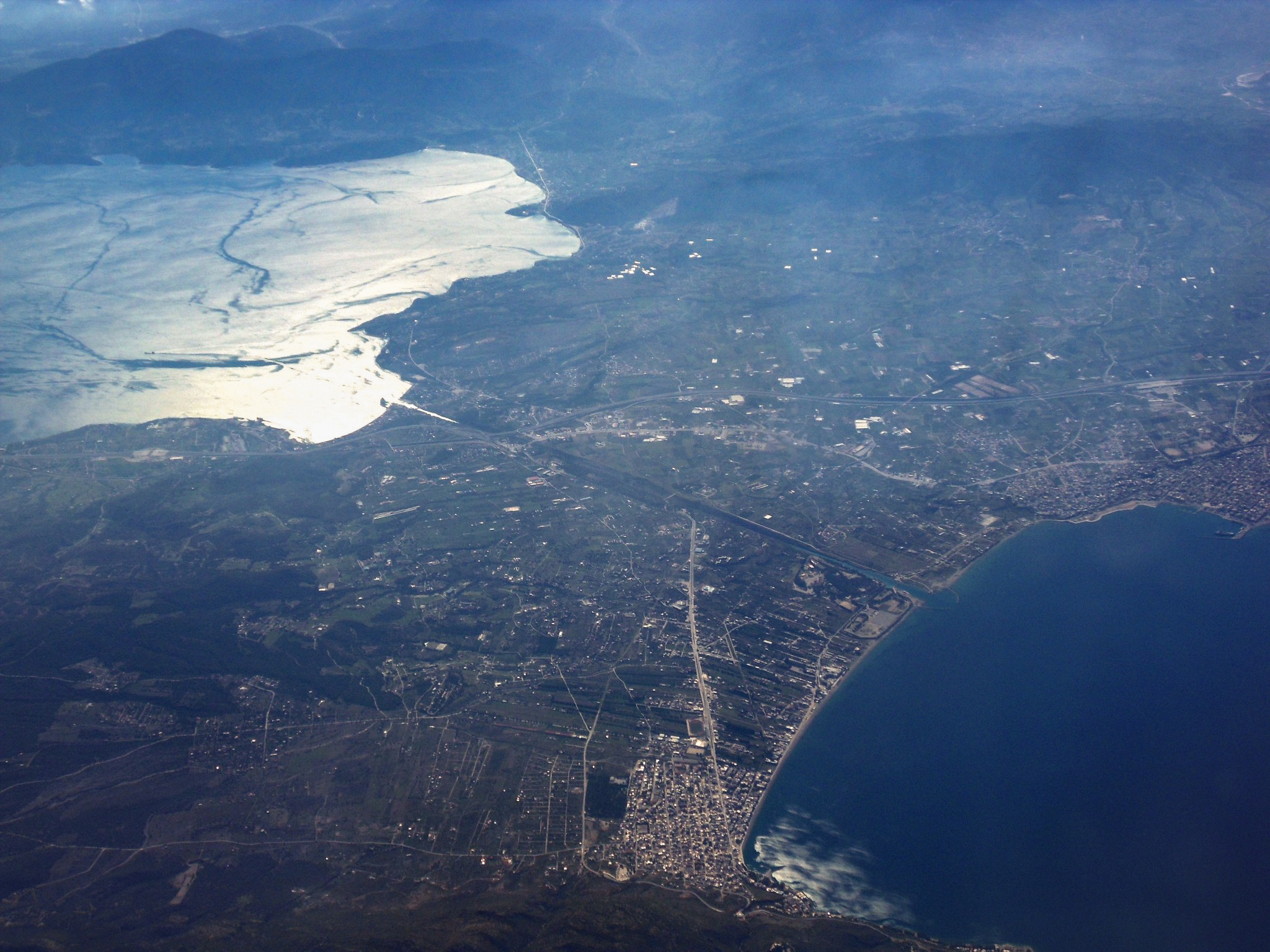
- Aerial photograph of the isthmus of Corinth

- Location within Greece
- Coordinates: 37°56′29″N 22°59′16″E
- Water bodies: Gulf of Corinth and Saronic Gulf

Dimensions
  - Width: 6.3 km (3.9 mi)

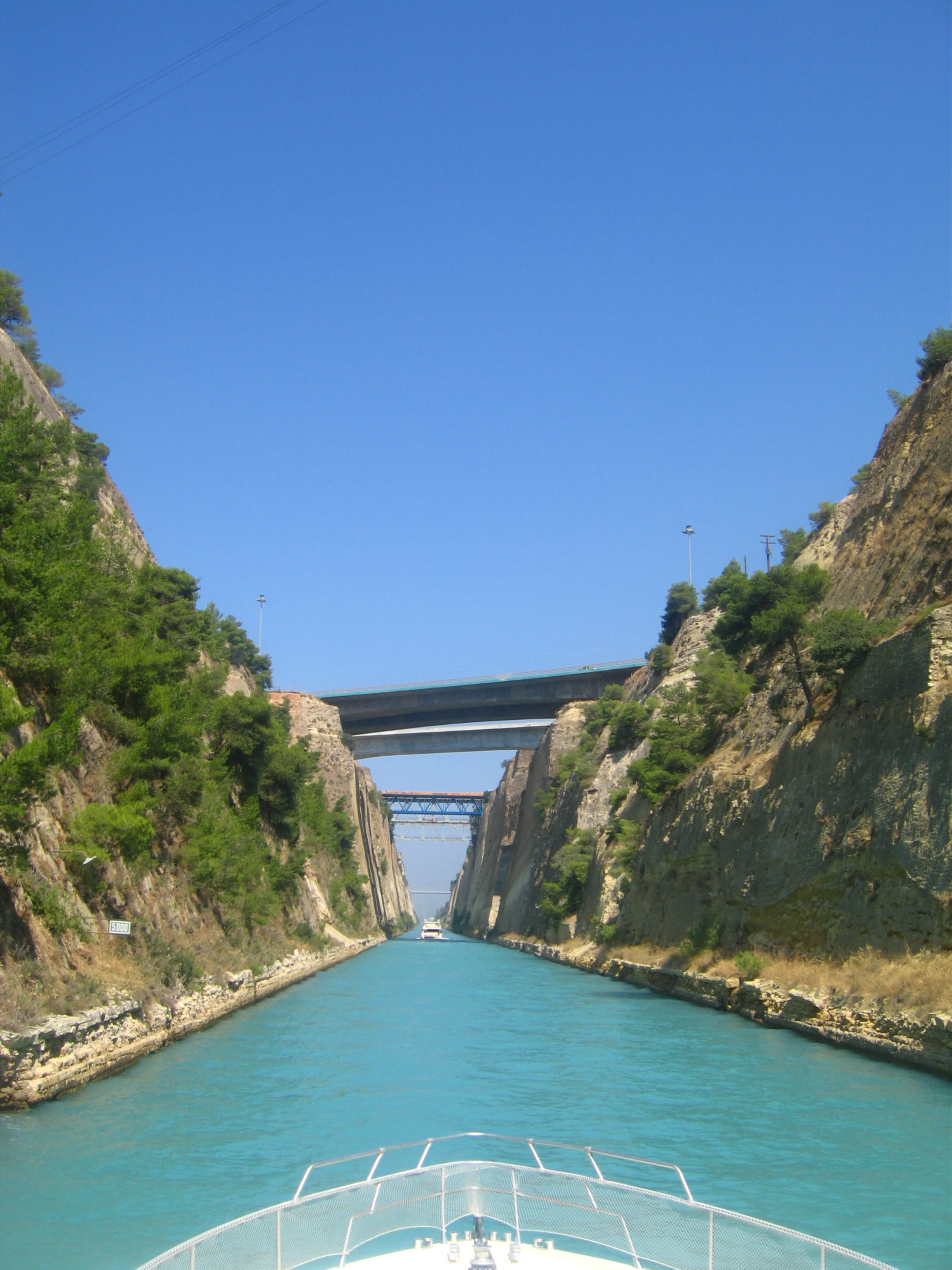
Passing through the isthmus of Corinth, using the Corinth Canal

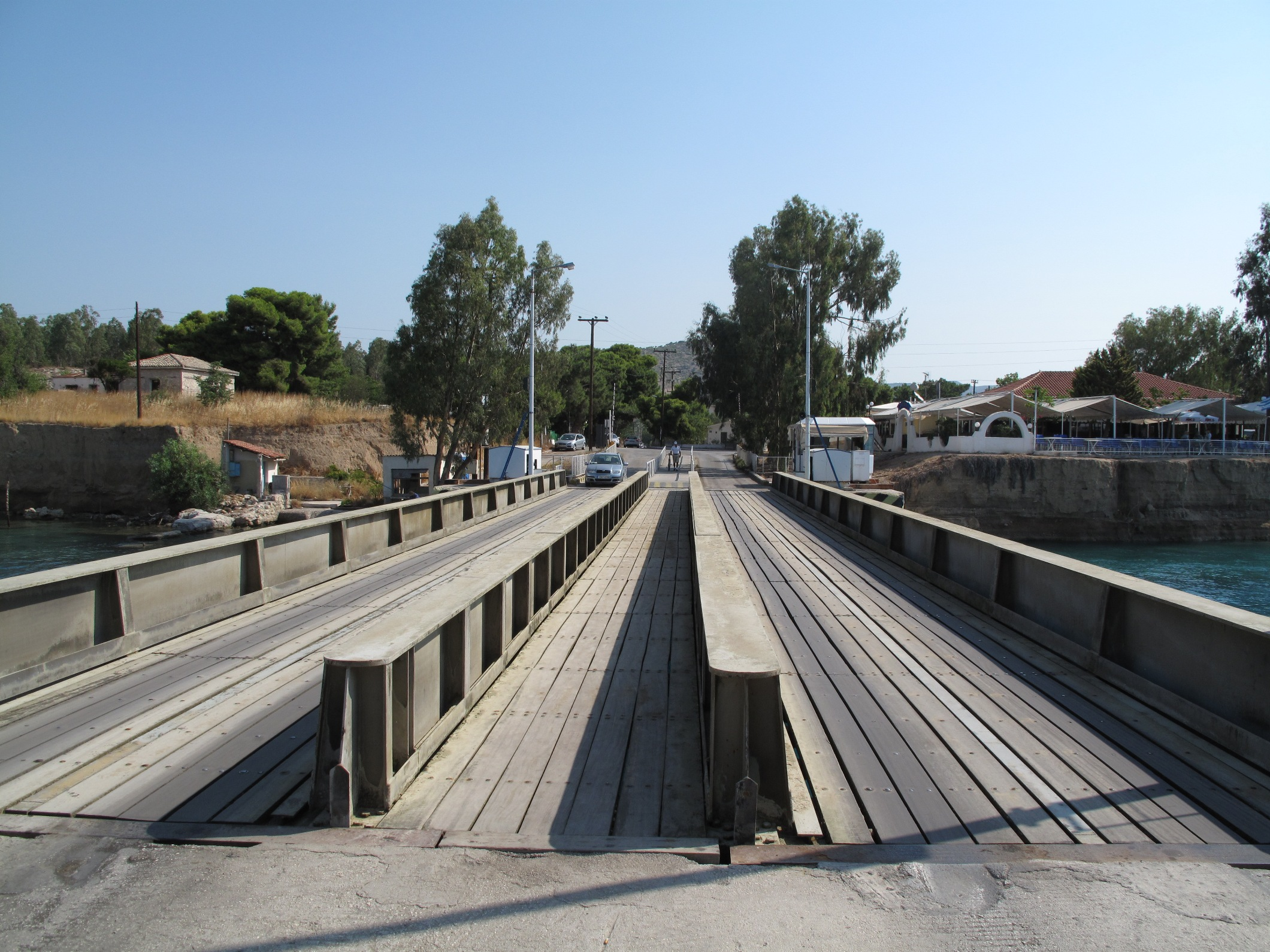
The submersible bridge at the Aegean side of canal

The Isthmus of Corinth (Greek: Ισθμός της Κορίνθου) is the narrow land bridge which connects the Peloponnese peninsula with the rest of the mainland of Greece, near the city of Corinth. The 6.3 km (3.9 mi) wide Isthmus was known in the ancient world as the landmark separating the Peloponnese from mainland Greece. In the first century AD the geographer Strabo noted a stele on the Isthmus of Corinth, which bore two inscriptions. One towards the East, i.e. towards Megara, reading: "Here is not Peloponnesus, but Ionia" (τάδ᾽ οὐχὶ Πελοπόννησος, ἀλλ᾽ Ἰωνία) and the one towards the West, i.e. towards the Peloponnese: "Here is Peloponnesus, not Ionia" (τάδ᾽ ἐστὶ Πελοπόννησος, οὐκ Ἰωνία); Plutarch ascribed the erection of the stele to the Attic hero Theseus, on his way to Athens.

To the west of the Isthmus is the Gulf of Corinth, and to the east the Saronic Gulf. Since 1893 the Corinth Canal has run through the isthmus, effectively making the Peloponnese an island. Today, two road bridges, two railway bridges and two submersible bridges at both ends of the canal connect the mainland side of the isthmus with the Peloponnese side. Also a military emergency bridge is located at the west end of the canal.

== History of the canal ==
The idea for a shortcut to save boats from having to sail all the way around the Peloponnese was long considered by the Ancient Greeks. The first attempt to build a canal there was carried out by the tyrant Periander in the 7th century BC. He abandoned the project owing to technical difficulties, and instead constructed a simpler and less costly overland stone ramp, named Diolkos, as a portage road. Remnants of Diolkos still exist today next to the modern canal. When the Romans took control of Greece, a number of different solutions were tried. Julius Caesar foresaw the advantages of a link for his newly built Colonia Laus Iulia Corinthiensis. By the reign of Tiberius, engineers tried to dig a canal, but were defeated by lack of modern equipment. Instead they built an Ancient Egyptian device: boats were rolled across the isthmus on logs, as the Egyptians had rolled blocks of granite to make their pyramids. This was in use by AD 32. In AD 67, the philhellene Roman emperor Nero ordered 6,000 slaves to dig a canal with spades. Historian Flavius Josephus writes that the 6,000 slaves were Jewish pirates, taken captive by Vespasian during the Jewish wars. According to Pliny the Elder, the work advanced four stadia (about 0.8 km or 1/2 mile). The following year Nero died, and his successor Galba abandoned the project as being too expensive.

In the modern era, the idea was first seriously proposed in 1830, soon after Greece's independence from the Ottoman Empire, and was brought to completion in 1893 after eleven years' work.

=== Preservation efforts ===
Near the canal runs an ancient stone trackway, the Diolkos, once used for dragging ships overland. There are major concerns about preservation of this path. Greek campaigners are calling for greater effort by the Greek government to protect this archaeological site.

== Hexamilion wall ==
The Hexamilion wall is a Roman defensive wall constructed across the Isthmus of Corinth guarding the only land route into the Peloponnese peninsula from mainland Greece. It is located close to the Corinth Canal, and is the largest single archaeological structure in Greece.

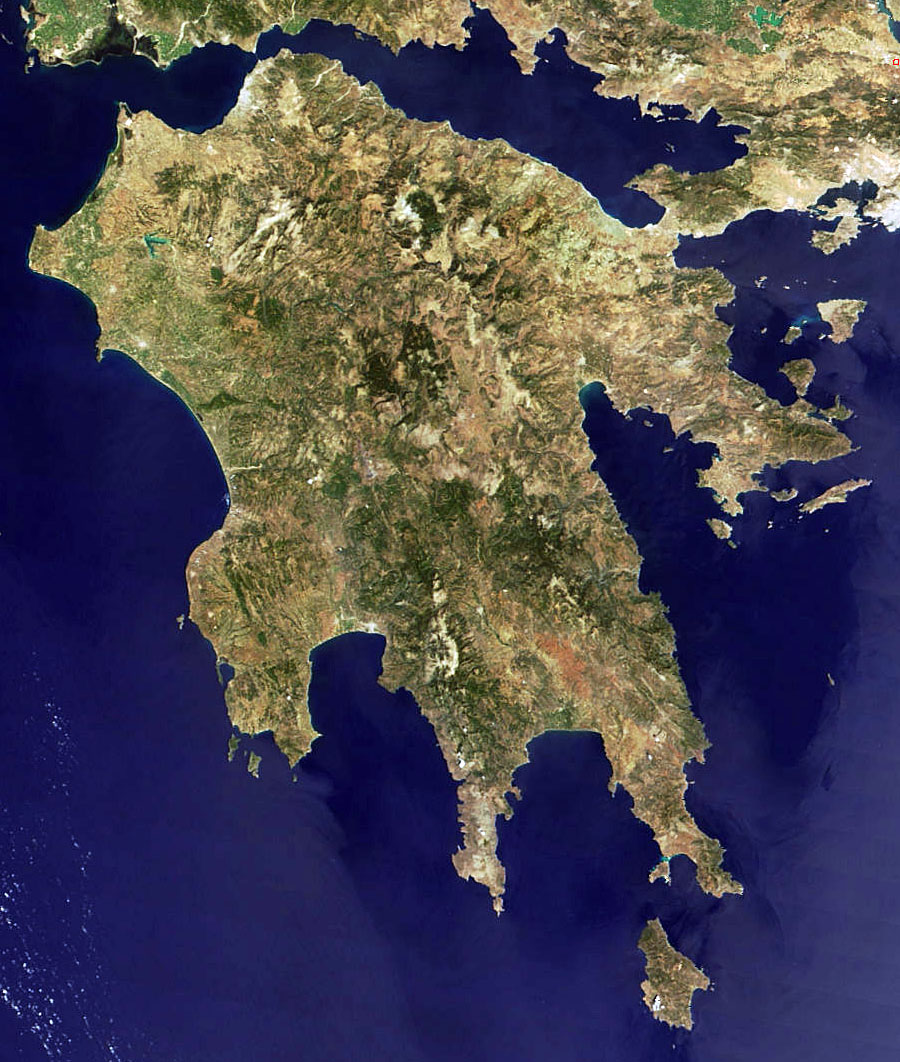
The Peloponnese seen from space, with the Isthmus of Corinth at upper right

Isthmus of Corinth

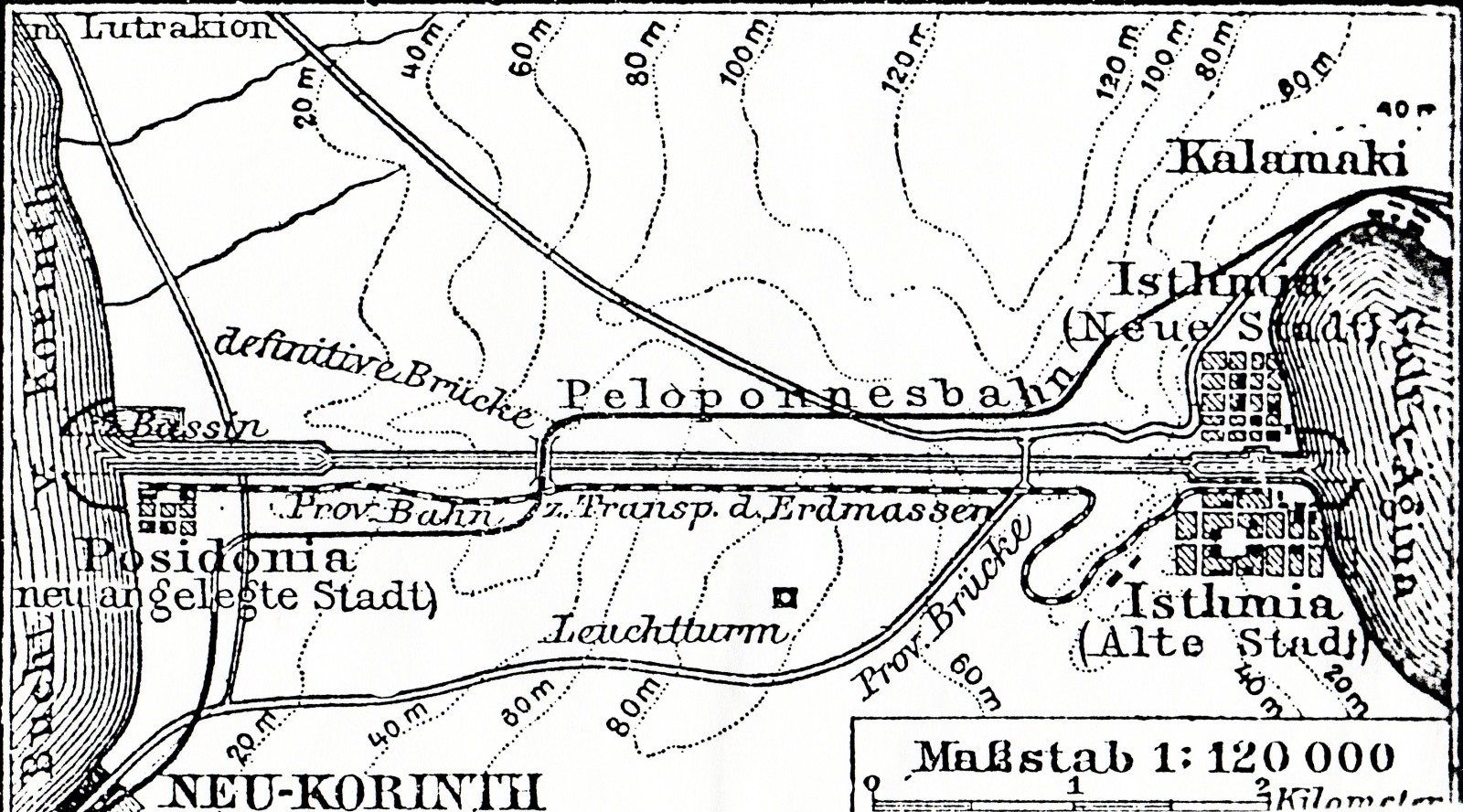
Old map of Corinth Canal area
