= Koutalas =

Koutalas (Greek: Κουταλάς) may refer to several places in Greece:

- Koutalas, Corinthia, a village in the municipal unit Tenea, Corinthia
- Koutalas, Messenia, a village in the municipality Kalamata, Messenia
- Koutalas, Cyclades, a village in the island of Serifos, one of the Cyclades
- Koutalas Cave, a cave on Serifos
