= Tenea =

Tenea Τενέα
- Municipal unit
- Location within the regional unit

- Location within Greece
- Coordinates: 37°48′N 22°52′E
- Country: Greece
- Administrative region: Peloponnese
- Regional unit: Corinthia
- Municipality: Corinth

Area
  - Municipal unit: 167.6 km^{2} (64.7 sq mi)
- Elevation: 290 m (950 ft)

Population (2021)
  - Municipal unit: 4,168
  - Municipal unit density: 24.87/km^{2} (64.41/sq mi)
- Time zone: UTC+2 (EET)
  - Summer (DST): UTC+3 (EEST)
- Postal code: 200 08
- Area code: 27410
- Vehicle registration: ΚΡ

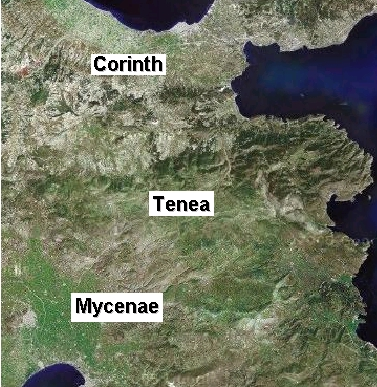
Satellite view of the region

Tenea (Greek: Τενέα) is a municipal unit within the municipality of Corinth, Corinthia, Peloponnese, Greece. The municipal unit has an area of 167.575 km^{2} (64.701 sq mi). Until 2011, its municipal seat was in Chiliomodi.

The modern city is named after ancient Tenea, established approximately 15 km (9.3 mi) southeast of Corinth and 20 km (12 mi) northeast of Mycenae shortly after the Trojan War. According to Pausanias, Tenea's founders were Trojan prisoners of war whom Agamemnon had allowed to build their own town. The name Tenea is styled upon Tenedos, the founders' hometown, whose mythological eponym was the hero Tenes. Tenea and Rome, according to Virgil's Aeneid, had in the years following the Trojan War produced citizens of Trojan ancestry. Under the leadership of Archias in 734 or 733 BC, Teneans and Corinthians established the joint colony of Syracuse in Sicily, the homeland of Archimedes.

== History ==
Tenea was the most important place in ancient Corinthia after the city of Corinth and its port towns. It was situated 60 stadia south of Corinth, according to Pausanias, hence the southern gate of Corinth was called the Teneatic. Stephanus of Byzantium describes Tenea as lying between Corinth and Mycenae. Pausanias says that the Teneatae claimed descent from the inhabitants of Tenedos, who were brought over from Troy as prisoners, and settled by Agamemnon in this part of Corinthia. It was in consequence of their Trojan origin that they worshipped Apollo above all the other gods. Strabo also mentions here the temple of Apollo Teneates and says that Tenea and Tenedos had a common origin in Tennes, the son of Cycnus. It was at Tenea that Oedipus was said to have passed his childhood. It was also from this place that Archias took majority of the colonists with whom he founded Syracuse. After the destruction of Corinth by Lucius Mummius Achaicus, Tenea had the good fortune to continue undisturbed, because it is said to have assisted the Romans against Corinth. It cannot be assumed that an insignificant place like Tenea could have acted in opposition to Corinth and the Achaean League. Instead, it is more probable that the Teneatae were spared by Mummius in consequence of their claimed Trojan descent and consequent affinity with the Romans themselves.

== Archaeological findings ==
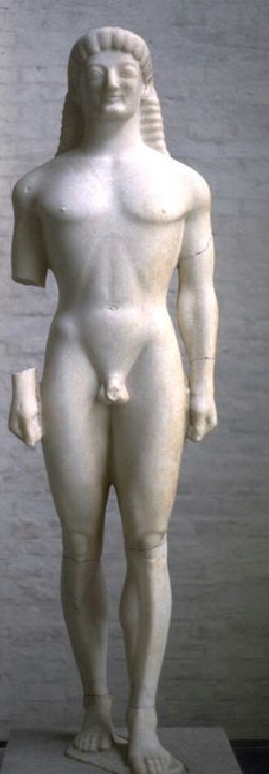
Kouros of Tenea with the archaic smile

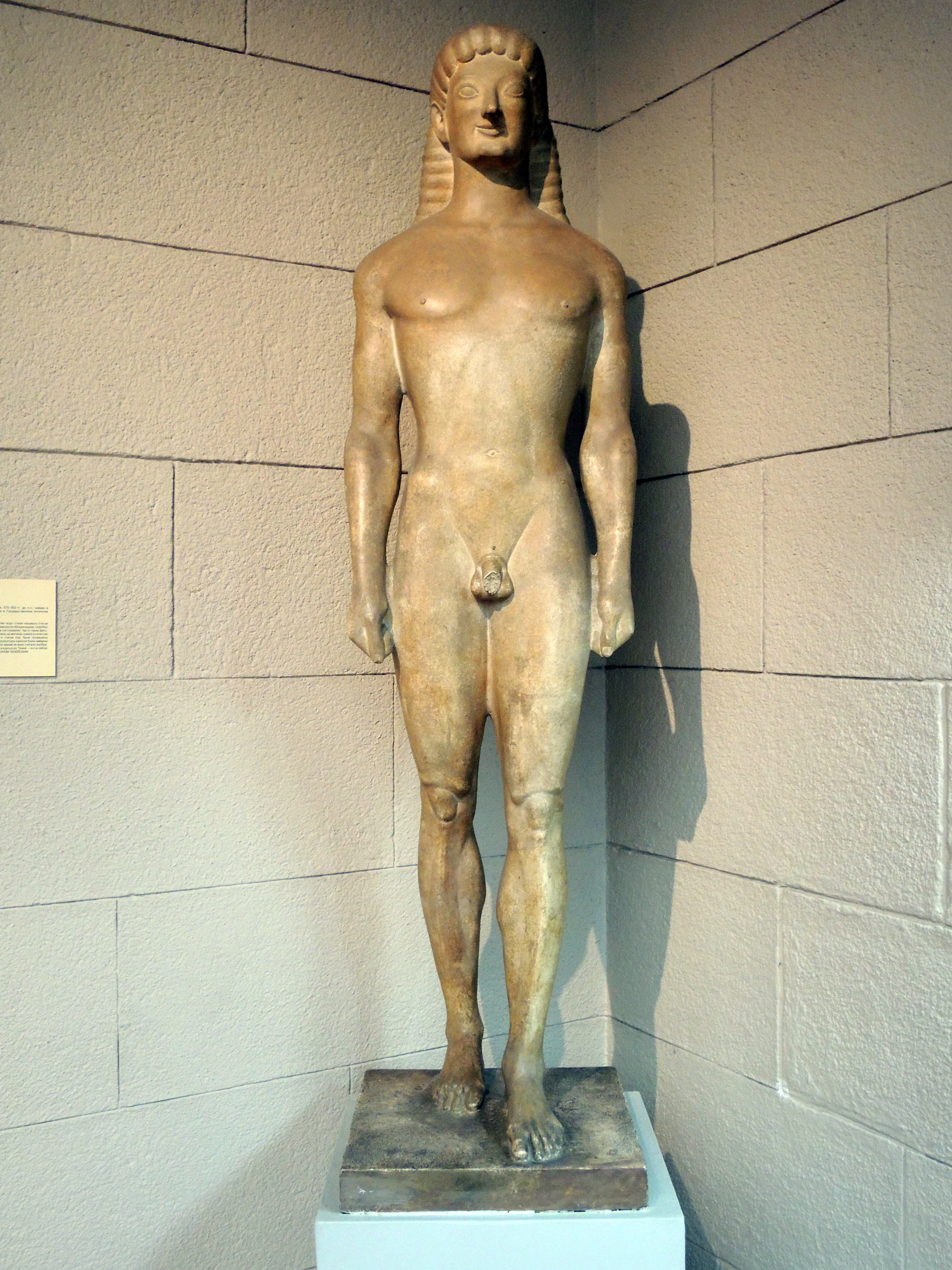
Apollo of Tenea in the Pushkin Museum

Ruins of ancient Tenea are one kilometre south of Chiliomodi. Some archaeological finds are housed in the Archaeological Museum of Ancient Corinth. The most famous find, the Kouros of Tenea (c. 550 BC), was found near Athikia in 1846 and is in the Munich Glyptothek. It is a high-quality example of 6th century BC Greek sculpture and of the so-called Aeginetean or archaic smile.

In 1984, archaeologists discovered a sarcophagus from the Greek early archaic period containing the remains of a high-society woman along with offerings.

In 2013, a team of archaeologists led by Elena Korka began to excavate a site in the area where Tenea was thought to have been, in search of the remains of the city. In 2017, they announced the discovery of a dual-chambered tomb containing fourteen graves, along with coins, gold and bronze artefacts, glassware, and pottery. In 2018, the Greek Ministry of Culture announced that the team had found proof of the existence of Tenea. The archeologists found evidence of long-term occupation of the settlement, perhaps from as early as the Mycenaean period up to the Roman occupation of Greece. In 2019, a large bath complex was discovered, covering around 500 square metres (5,400 sq ft). The complex dated to between the late-3rd and mid-1st century BC.

== Subdivisions ==
The municipal unit of Tenea is subdivided into the following communities, with constituent villages indicated in brackets:

- Agionori
- Agios Vasileios
- Chiliomodi
- Klenia
- Koutalas (Koutalas, Mapsos, Spathovouni)
- Stefani

== Historical population ==
Year	Population
1991	5,245
2001	5,136
2011	5,084
2021	4,168

== See also ==
- List of traditional Greek place names
