= Chiliomodi =

Village in Corinthia, Greece

Chiliomodi Χιλιομόδι
- Community
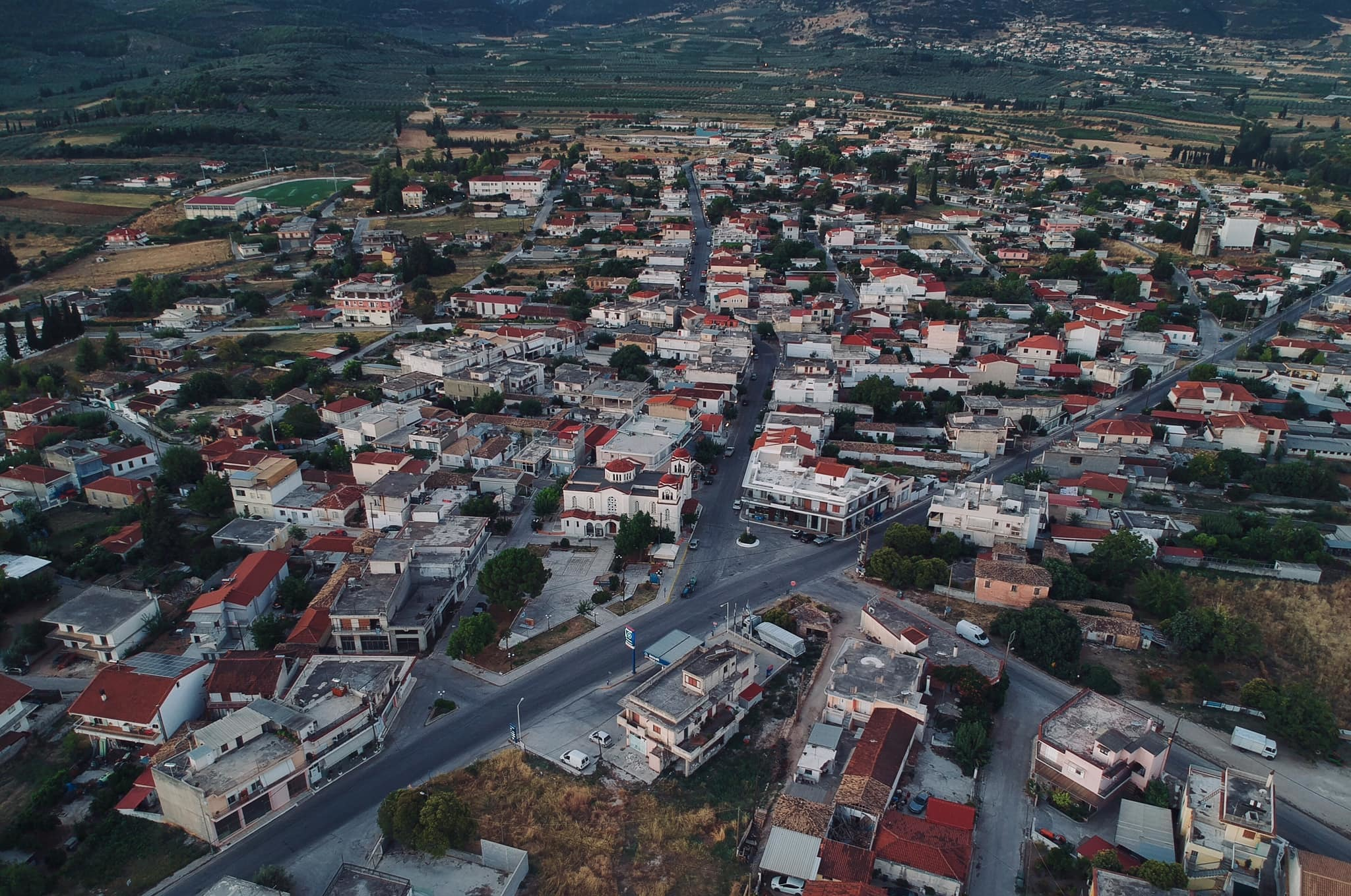
- Chiliomodi

- Location within Greece
- Coordinates: 37°48.5′N 22°52.2′E
- Country: Greece
- Administrative region: Peloponnese
- Regional unit: Corinthia
- Municipality: Corinth
- Municipal unit: Tenea

Population (2021)
  - Community: 1,510
- Time zone: UTC+2 (EET)
  - Summer (DST): UTC+3 (EEST)
- Postal code: 200 08
- Vehicle registration: ΚΡ

Chiliomodi (Greek: Χιλιομόδι) is a village in Corinthia, Peloponnese, Greece. It was the seat of the municipality of Tenea. Chiliomodi is situated in a valley, 3 km southeast of Koutalas, 5 km west of Athikia, 21 km southwest of Corinth and 43 km northeast of Argos. It is on the Greek National Road 7 (Corinth – Argos – Tripoli – Kalamata) and on the railway from Corinth to Kalamata. Chiliomodi has several schools, shops and a church. Chiliomodi suffered damage from the 2007 Greek forest fires.

== Climate ==
Chiliomodi has a hot-summer Mediterranean climate (Köppen climate classification: Csa). Chiliomodi experiences hot, dry summers and cool, wet winters.

Climate data for Chiliomodi (1971-2000 modeled normals)
Month	Jan	Feb	Mar	Apr	May	Jun	Jul	Aug	Sep	Oct	Nov	Dec	Year
Mean daily maximum °C (°F)	11.19 (52.14)	11.87 (53.37)	14.62 (58.32)	19.20 (66.56)	24.46 (76.03)	29.67 (85.41)	30.83 (87.49)	30.89 (87.60)	27.90 (82.22)	22.72 (72.90)	16.72 (62.10)	12.65 (54.77)	21.06 (69.91)
Daily mean °C (°F)	7.69 (45.84)	8.08 (46.54)	9.64 (49.35)	14.08 (57.34)	19.46 (67.03)	24.31 (75.76)	25.86 (78.55)	25.58 (78.04)	22.07 (71.73)	16.98 (62.56)	11.98 (53.56)	9.17 (48.51)	16.32 (61.38)
Mean daily minimum °C (°F)	3.90 (39.02)	4.40 (39.92)	5.66 (42.19)	8.68 (47.62)	11.74 (53.13)	16.20 (61.16)	18.11 (64.60)	17.92 (64.26)	14.27 (57.69)	10.83 (51.49)	7.74 (45.93)	5.22 (41.40)	10.78 (51.40)
Average precipitation mm (inches)	73.75 (2.90)	75.60 (2.98)	72.12 (2.84)	45.96 (1.81)	26.72 (1.05)	15.67 (0.62)	14.91 (0.59)	16.89 (0.66)	22.86 (0.90)	78.19 (3.08)	99.31 (3.91)	91.43 (3.60)	633.41 (24.94)
Mean monthly sunshine hours	113.90	126.73	159.62	204.24	268.58	320.09	327.86	309.56	257.07	190.52	117.01	94.18	2,529.2
Source: Hellenic National Meteorological Service

== Notable people ==
- Panagiotis Verdes, inventor of 6x6x6, 7x7x7, 8x8x8, 9x9x9 Twisty Puzzles
- Irene Papas (1929–2022), actress and singer
- Manousos Manousakis (1950–2024), writer, director
- 1000mods, stoner rock band

== Historical population ==
Year	Population
1981	1,704
1991	1,718
2001	1,750
2011	1,699
2021	1,510

== Archaeological findings ==
Near the village of Chiliomodi in 2018, archaeologists led by Elena Korka discovered “proof of the existence of the ancient city” of Tenea which is assumed to be founded by prisoners of the mythic Trojan War. Stone, clay and marble floors, about 200 rare coins, seven burials with vases and jewelry dating to the Roman era and Hellenistic period were revealed during the excavation. According to Elena Korka, Tenea's cutting coins was the indicator of its complete independence.

== See also ==
- List of settlements in Corinthia
