= Baekje smile =

Motif in Korean art history

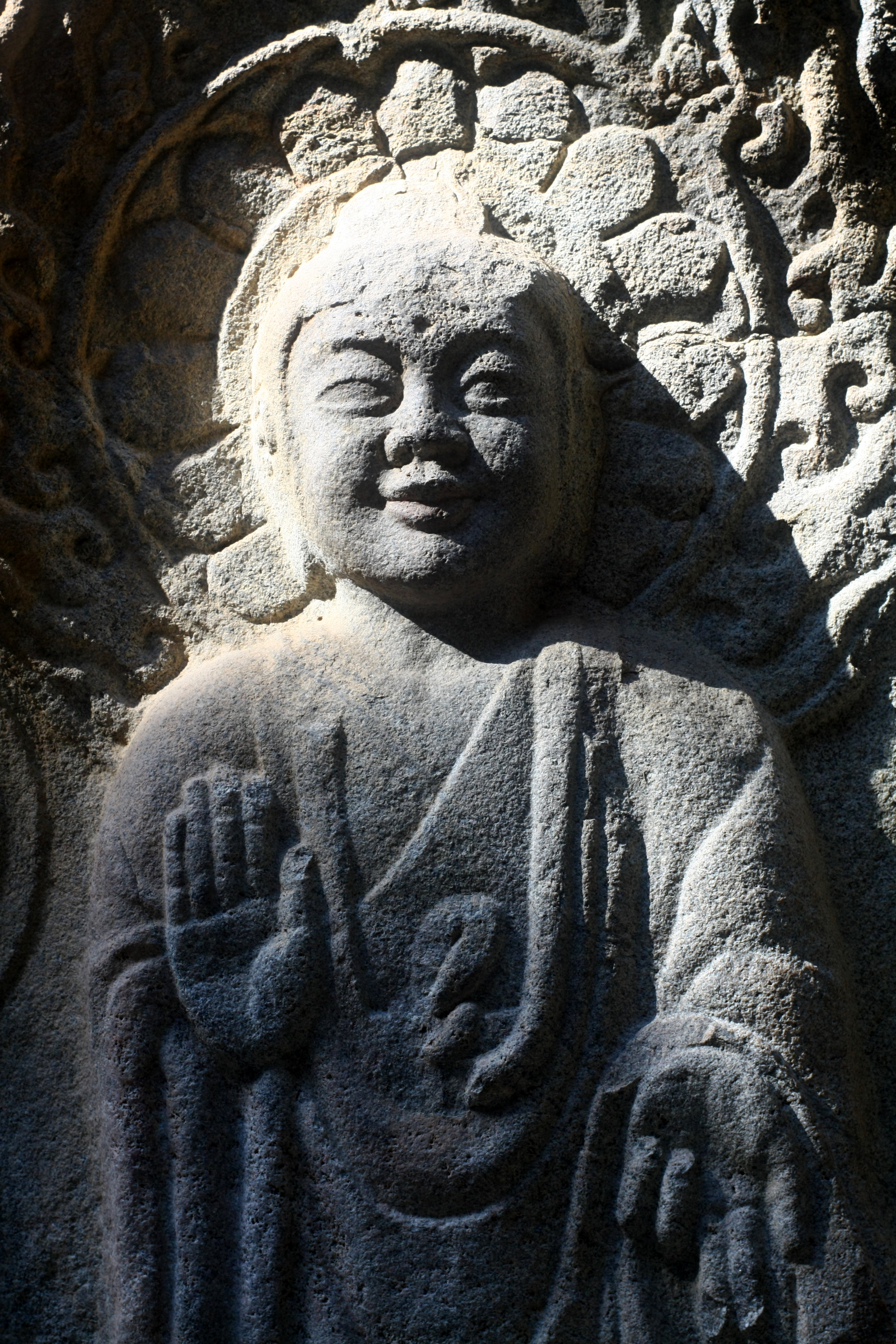
- A smiling Rock-carved triad buddha in Seosan Baekje

Korean name
- Hangul: 백제인의 미소
- Hanja: 百濟人의 微笑
- RR: Baekjeinui miso
- MR: Paekcheinŭi miso

In Korean art history, the Baekje smile is the common smile motif found in Baekje sculpture and bas-relief. Baekje figures express a unique smile that has been described as both enigmatic and subtle. The smile has also been characterized in many different ways from "genuinely glowing" to "thin and mild" to "unfathomable and benevolent".

While Goguryeo sculpture was highly rigid, and Silla sculpture was formalized, Baekje sculpture exhibited distinct characteristics of warmth, softness, and used relaxed poses. Sometimes, the Baekje style has been attributed to influence from the southern Chinese dynasties. The smile gives the Baekje statues a sense of friendliness and an air of pleasantness that is rarely found in other traditions of Buddhist sculpture. The smile is considered to be unique and distinctive.

== See also ==
- Archaic smile
- Baekje
- Korean art
- Gilt-bronze Maitreya in Meditation
