= Serifos miners strike =

1916 strike in Serifos, Greece

- Date: 7–21 August 1916
- Location: Serifos, Greece
- Goals: Eight-hour work day Improvement of working conditions Increase in wages
- Methods: Strike

Parties
Union of Workingmen and Miners of Serifos	Greek Police

Lead figures
Konstantinos Speras	Charilaos Chryssanthou

Casualties and losses
Deaths: 6 Injuries: unknown	Deaths: 4 Injuries: unknown

Serifos miners strike was a strike action by mineworkers on the Greek island of Serifos that occurred in the summer of 1916. The strike resulted in the workers taking control of the island after a fight with the police. Five workers and four police officers died during the fight. The strike and the events that followed caused the government to send a warship and to imprison some of strikers. However, many of the workers' demands were satisfied, including the establishment of the 8-hour workday for the first time in Greece.

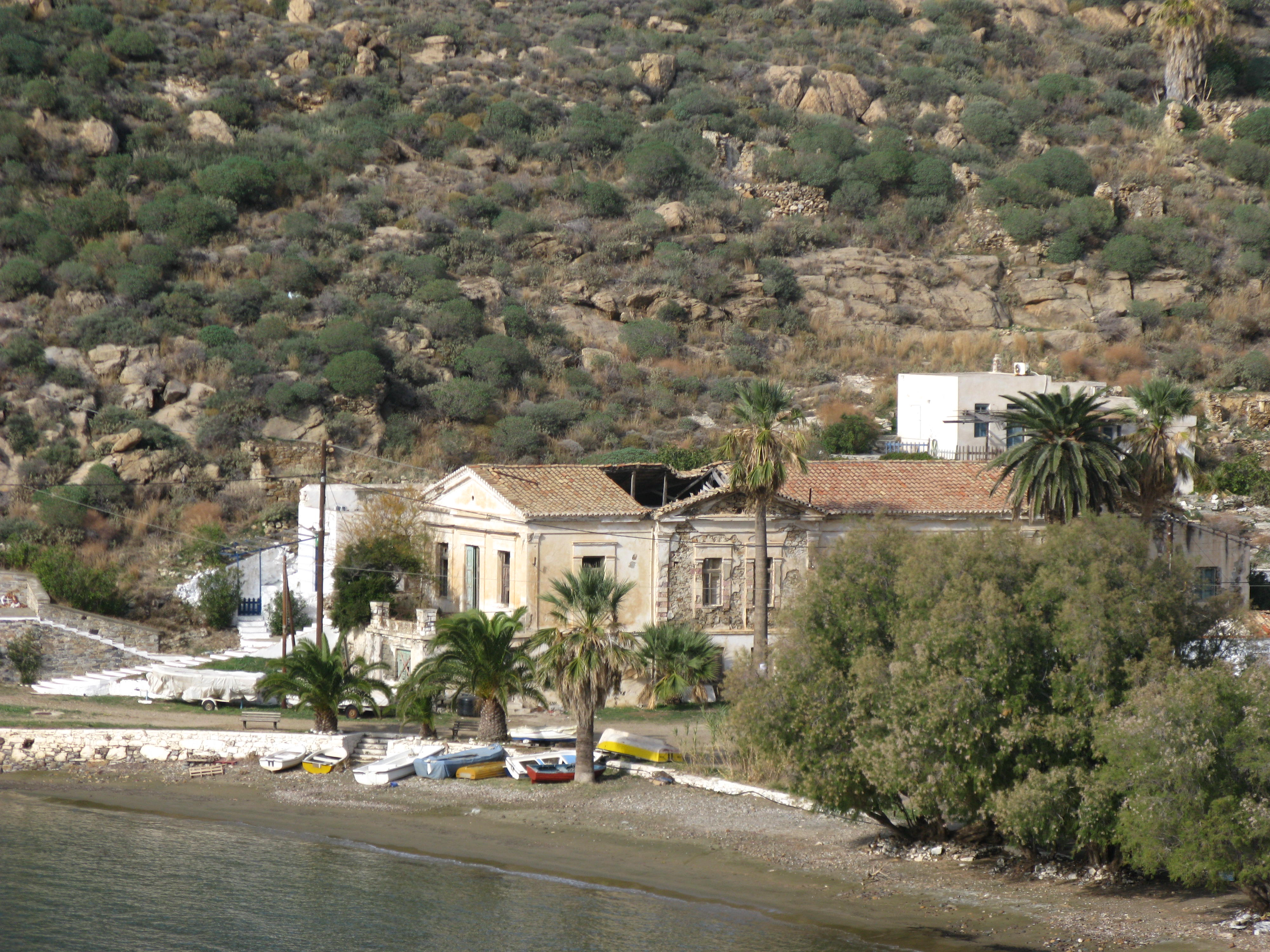
Headquarters of the former mine company of Serifos in Megalo Livadi

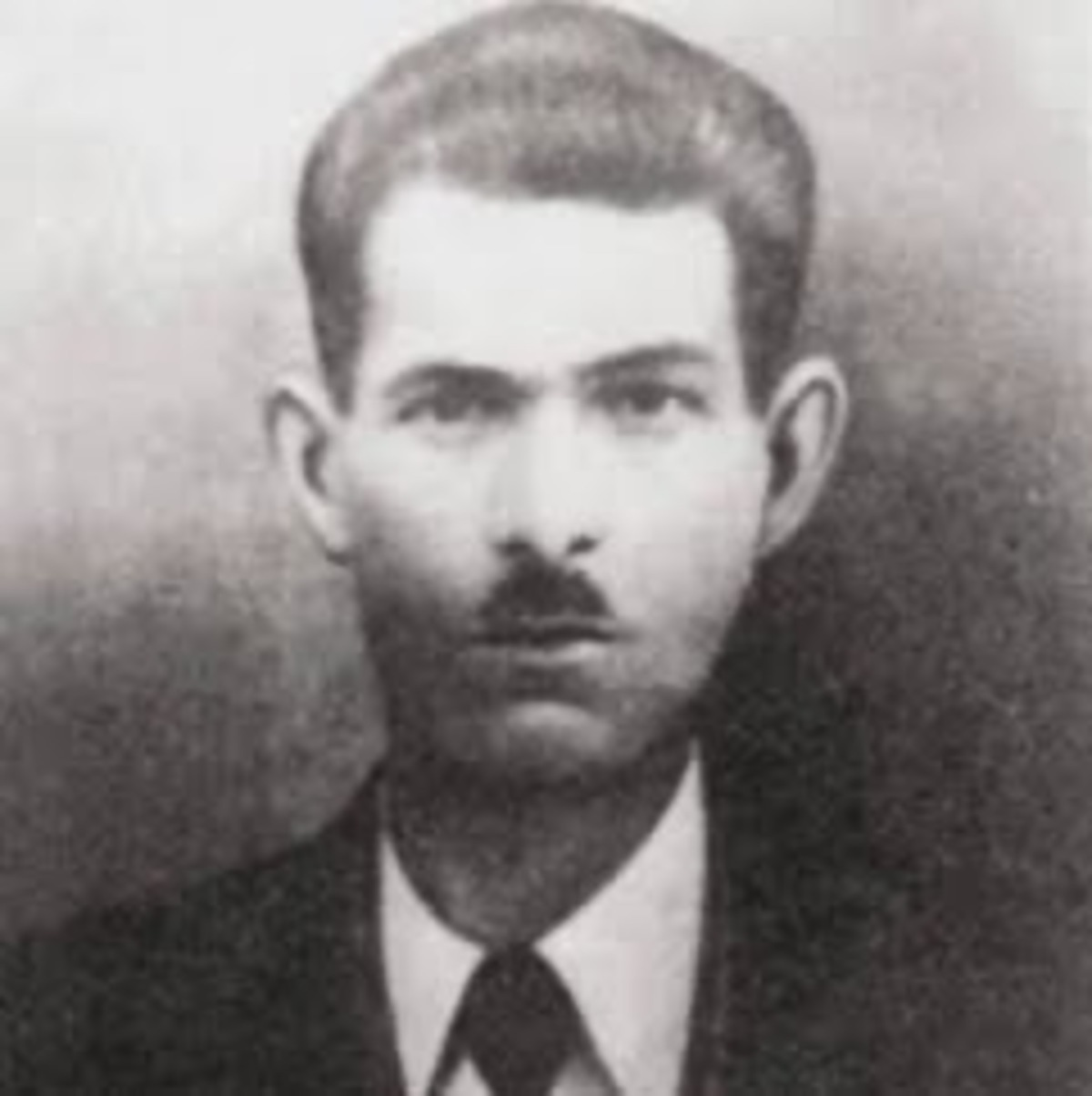
Konstantinos Speras (1893–1943)

== Background ==
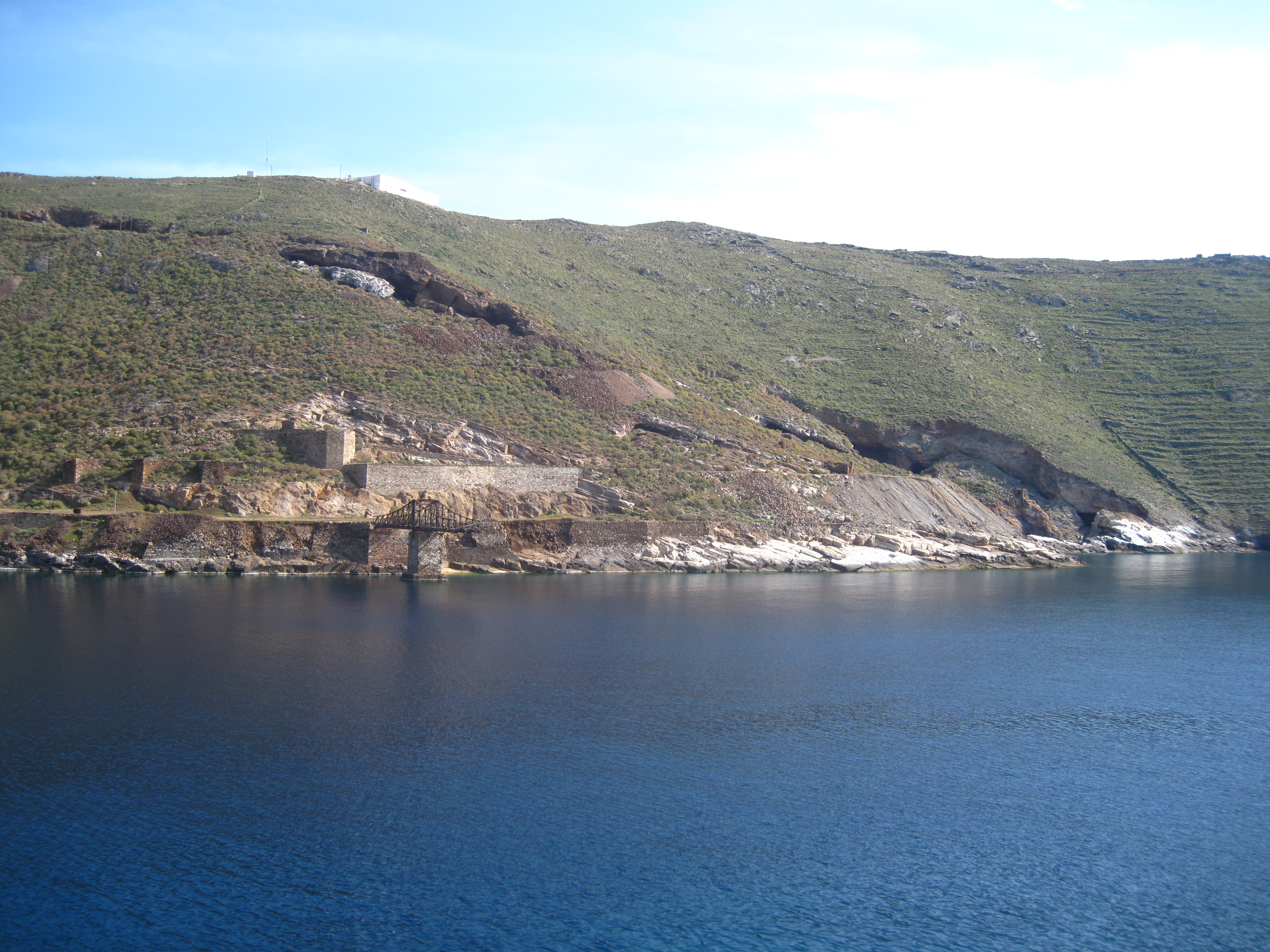
The mines

Serifos' mines came under control of Emilios Gromman in 1885. Several small landowners were stripped of their land, in many occasions forcibly, and given a miner's wage as an exchange. The mining activities resulted in the radical growth of the island's population, due to incoming workers and their families: from 2,134 inhabitants in 1880, the population had reached 4,000 by the early 1910s. Emilios Gromman died in 1905 and the mines were inherited by his son who proved to be a far worse employer. According to testimonies of the inhabitants of the island, the working conditions were inhumane: the workday was from sunrise to sunset without a break, 6 days per week, no worker protective equipment was used, and the wage was barely enough for the workers to survive. Between 1914-1916, 60 workers were killed. The workers were not even allowed to go outside to urinate or defecate and a barrel was used for this.

In 24 July 1916, the workers, motivated by anarcho-syndicalist Konstantinos Speras, formed a union named Union of Workingmen and Miners of Serifos, with Speras as its first president. The union's statutory text, signed by 460 members, demanded the reduction of the working day to 8 hours, increases in the wages and in safety measures.

== The strike ==
On 7 August, the workers refused to load the mining production to the ship that was to carry it away, until their demands were satisfied. The management refused and informed the government about the events. The strike went on without violence until 21 August when a police squad of 30 officers under the orders of Charilaos Chryssanthou arrested the leadership of the union and ordered the workers to start loading the ship in 5 minutes otherwise they would fire. Chryssanthou fired and killed one of the strikers before the 5 minute notice had passed. The other police officers started firing too, and the workers (over 400 in number) along with their families responded by throwing rocks at the police officers, killing four of them and forcing the rest to retreat. According to some sources, the bodies of Chryssanthou and the other dead police officers were then thrown to the sea.

== Aftermath ==
After the bloody events, the workers captured some of the main municipal buildings such as the police headquarters and the city hall and took control of the island. Disappointed by the Greek state, the workers raised a French flag and called the French navy force stationed in Milos (a neighboring island) to help attending the wounded and to negotiate the territory joining France. The French refused to avoid intervening with internal Greek affairs, after which the Greek government sent a warship with 250 soldiers and arrested the leadership of the worker's movement. However due to the popular support of the strike by the island's residents, some of the demands of the strikers were satisfied: the work-day was reduced to 8 hours per day for the first time in Greece, wages were increased and the transport to and from the mines was covered by the company.

The initiator of the strike, Konstantinos Speras, wrote a book named Η απεργία της Σερίφου ("The Strike of Serifos") about the events.

== Commemoration ==
The local community has raised a monument to the workers that died during the strike and for those that stood with them. Each year they organize a ceremony in honor of the fallen. A statue to Speras has also been raised.

== See also ==
- Kalamata dock workers' strike
- Kileler uprising
