= 1000mods =

Greek stoner metal band

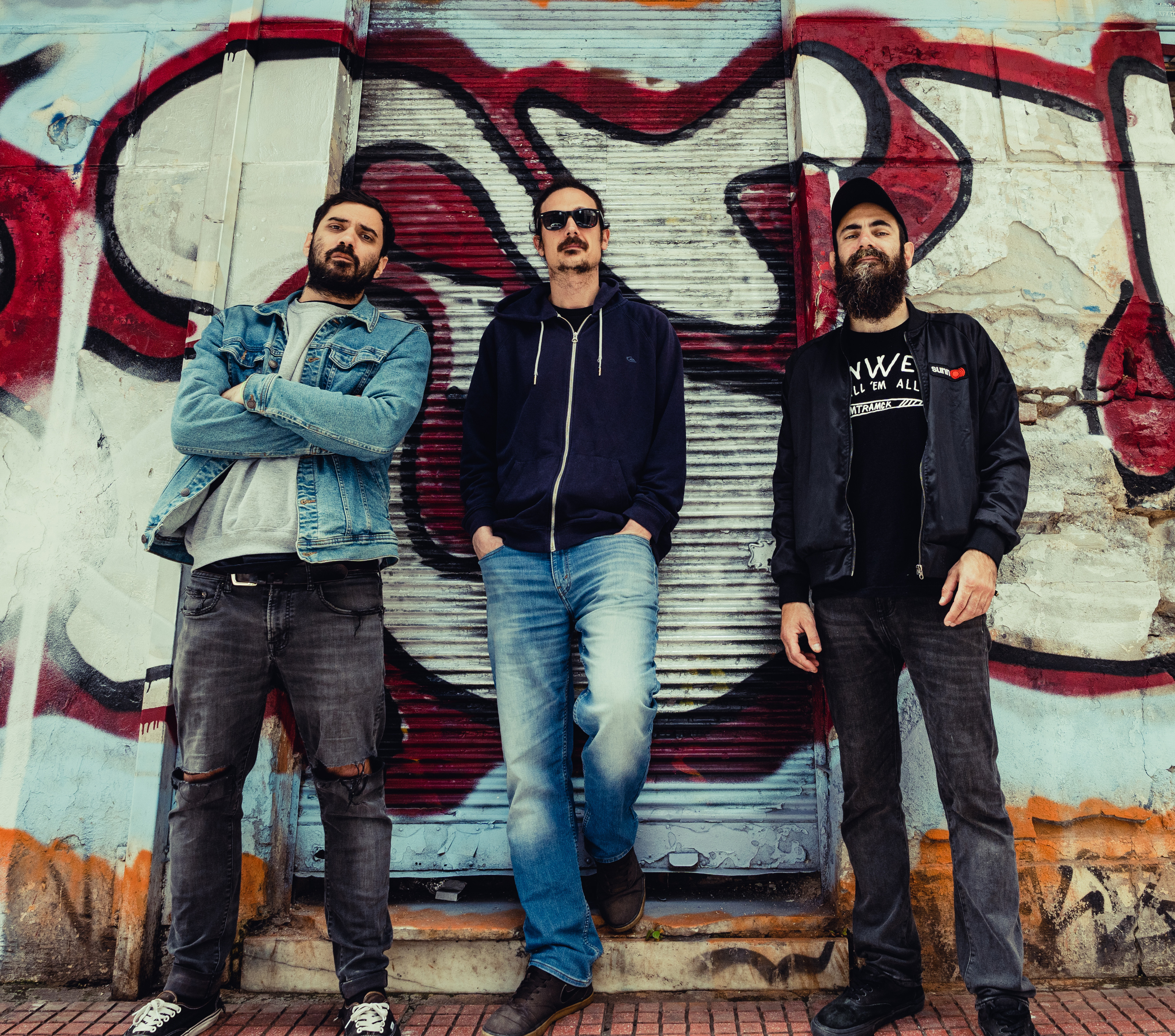
- 1000mods - Band members

Background information
- Origin: Chiliomodi, Greece
- Genres: Stoner rock; Hard rock; Psychedelic rock; Heavy metal; Desert rock; Grunge; Doom metal
- Years active: 2006–present
- Labels: Ouga Booga and the Mighty Oug; Kozmik Artifactz; CTS; The Lab
- Members: Dani G.; Giorgos T.; Labros G.
- Past members: Giannis S.
- Website: 1000mods.com

1000mods is a hard rock band from Chiliomodi, Greece, formed in 2006. The group consists of Dani G. (vocals and bass), Giorgos T. (guitar), and Labros G. (drums). Since their formation, the band has toured extensively across the globe and released five full-length studio albums.

The name of the group is a pun linked to the village in which they were formed, as the word for "thousand" in Greek is "chilia".

== History ==
1000mods formed in 2006. The band released two EPs, Blank Reality in 2007 and Liquid Sleep in 2009.

In October 2010, they produced their first album Super Van Vacation with Billy Anderson (Sleep, Neurosis). In order to promote their debut album, they played two European tours with 40 shows in 15 countries, including festivals such as Rockwave Festival, Desertfest and Lake on Fire.

The second album Vultures was released on 30 May 2014 by The Lab Records. Two European tours followed with a two-month tour on October / November 2014 named "Claws Over Europe" and a tour supporting The Atomic Bitchwax during May 2015.

In September 2016, the band released its third album Repeated Exposure To... via Ouga Booga and the Mighty Oug Recordings. The album was produced and mixed by 1000mods and George Leodis leading up engineering at Wreck It Sound Studios in Corinth, Greece. The album was mastered by Brad Boatright (Sleep, Toxic Holocaust) at Audiosiege Studios, Portland, Oregon. In October 2016 the band embarked on a 27-date European Tour with Monkey3 and Moaning Cities.

Τheir 2017 Repeated and Exposed To... tour features a total of 42 live dates in 15 European countries, participating in festivals such as Up in Smoke, Desertfest and Keep it Low.

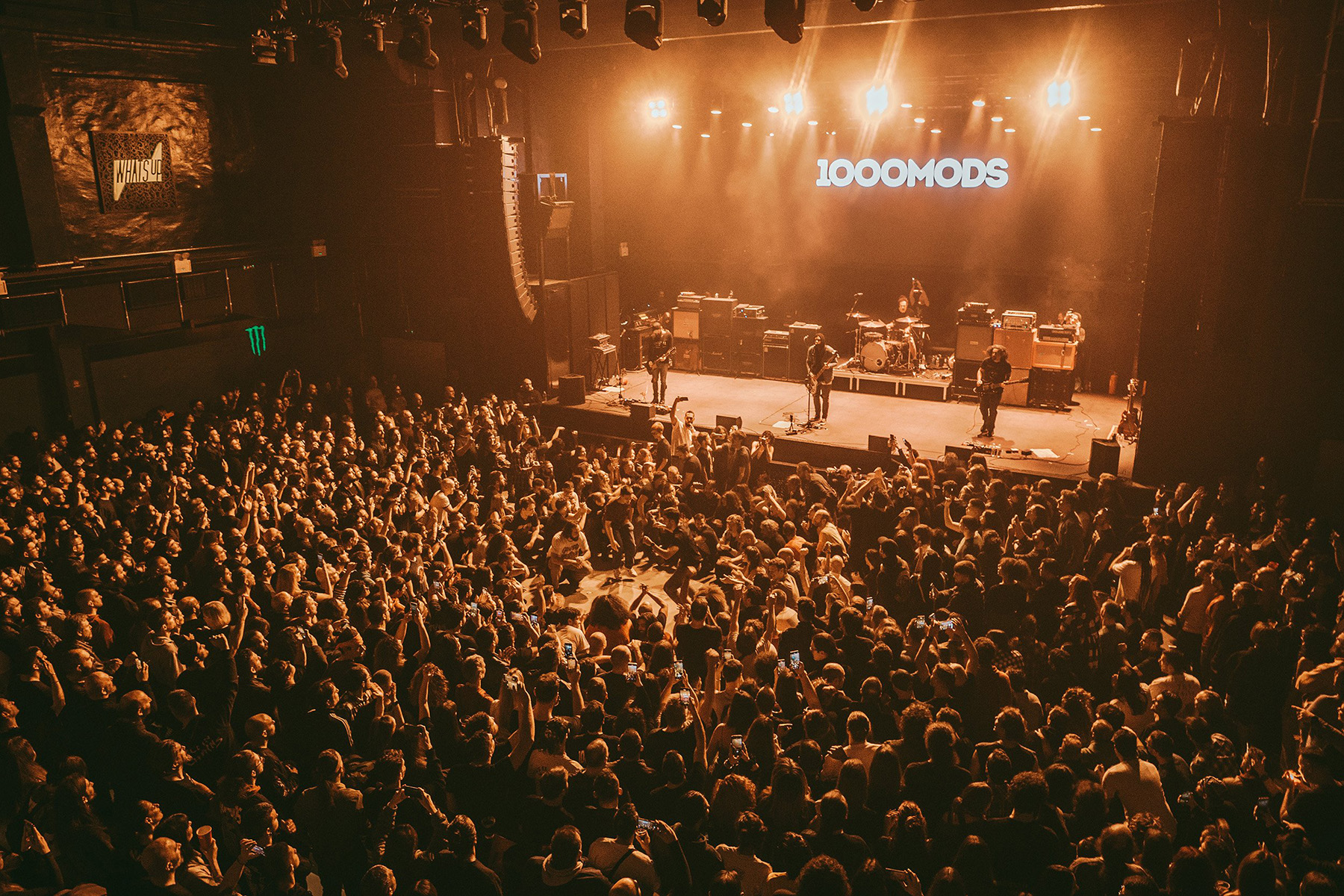
1000mods - Live in Athens (2024)

During February and March 2018, 1000mods visited North America for the first time, including Mexico, Canada and United States, for 29 shows. They returned to the United States five years later in the fall of 2023, embarking on a two-month tour across the country. During their coast-to-coast North American dates, they were joined by bands like Freedom Hawk, Valley of the Sun, Wizzerd and The Well.

Together with the Pearl single, the band released their fourth album Youth of Dissent in 2020. The band would record the album in Seattle, Washington with producer Matt Bayles (Pearl Jam, Soundgarden, Mastodon, etc.) at London Bridge Studio and Studio Litho. Mixing took place at Red Room and Mastering took place at Resonant Mastering in Seattle. Youth of Dissent is released in the Spring of 2020 via the band's own label Ouga Booga And The Mighty Oug Recordings.

In April 2024, Giannis S. departed the band for personal reasons while maintaining a good relationship with the other members and continuing to collaborate through Ouga Booga and the Mighty Oug Recordings. During the rest of the year, Marios Samaris of the band Blame Kandinsky filled in on guitar for their UK and Ireland tour, while Ioannis Fotiadis filled in on guitar during the European Fall Tour in 2024.

Their fifth album “Cheat Death (2024)” has been released on Ouga Booga and the Mighty Oug Recordings (world) and Ripple Music (US) in November 2024. The album drew the attention of many new fans and was recognized as one of the band’s heaviest releases to date.

== Discography ==
=== Studio albums ===
- Super Van Vacation (2011, Kozmik Artifactz)
- Vultures (2014, The Lab Records)
- Repeated Exposure To... (2016, Ouga Booga and the Mighty Oug Recordings)
- Youth of Dissent (2020, Ouga Booga and the Mighty Oug Recordings)
- Cheat Death (2024, Ouga Booga and the Mighty Oug Recordings)

=== EPs ===
- The Woodrose Effect EP (2009)
- Blank Reality (2007, self-released)
- Liquid Sleep (2009, SuiSound Productions/CTS Productions)

=== Singles ===
- Valley of Sand (2012, The Lab Records)
- Pearl (2020, Ouga Booga and the Mighty Oug Recordings)

=== Splits ===
- 1000mods vs Wight (2010, Fat & Holy Records)
