= Livadi, Serifos =

Livadi Λιβάδι
- Settlement
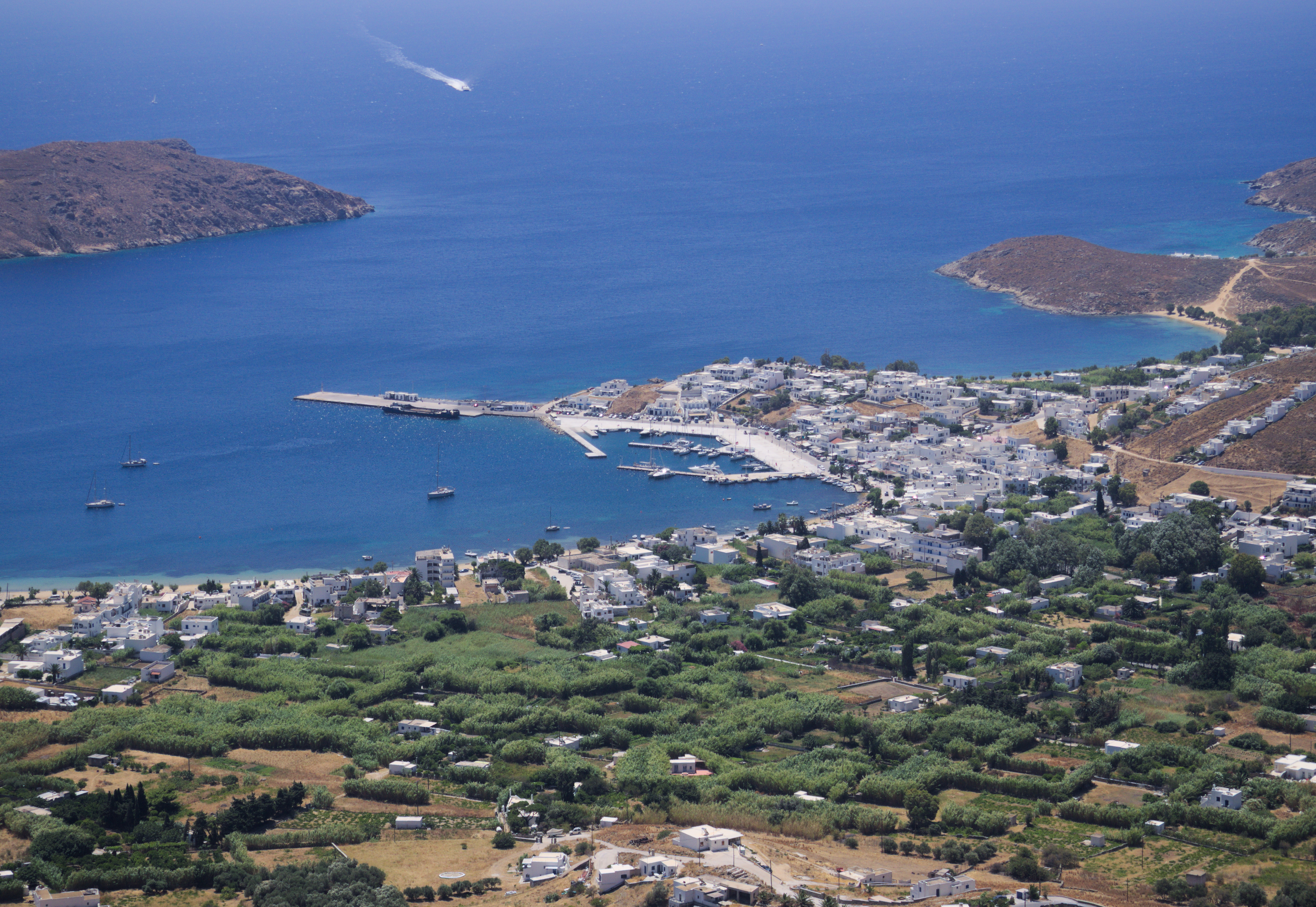
- Livadi view from Chora

- Location within Greece
- Coordinates: 37°8′32″N 24°30′52″E
- Country: Greece
- Administrative region: South Aegean
- Regional unit: Milos
- Municipality: Serifos

Population (2021)
  - Total: 505
- Time zone: UTC+2 (EET)
  - Summer (DST): UTC+3 (EEST)

Livadi (Greek: Λιβάδι) is the largest settlement and the main port of Serifos. According to the 2021 Greek census it had 505 inhabitants. It is located in the southeastern edge of the island in a distance of about 5 km (3.1 mi) from the capital (chora).

It is built following the traditional Cyclades architecture, with white cubic-shaped houses. In the continuation of the village to the south, Livadakia, there is the only camping of the island.
