= Archaic smile =

Festure used by Archaic Greek sculptors

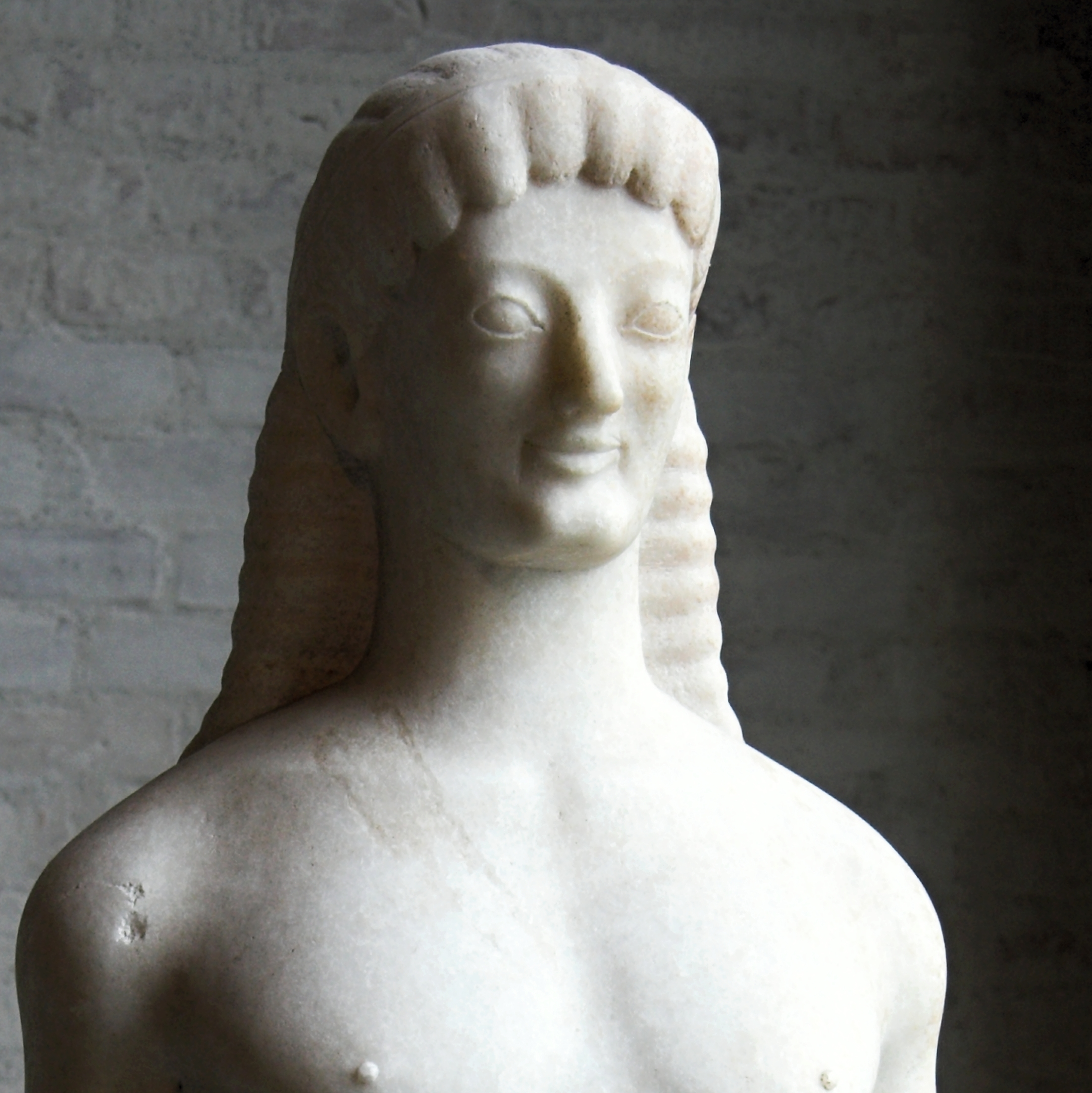
Kouros of Tenea, 560–550 BCE, Glyptothek Munich

The archaic smile was used by sculptors in Archaic Greece, especially in the second quarter of the 6th century BCE, possibly to suggest that their subject was alive and infused with a sense of well-being. One of the most famous examples of the archaic smile is the Kroisos Kouros, and the Peplos Kore is another.

By the middle of the Archaic Period of ancient Greece (roughly 800 BCE to 480 BCE), the art that proliferated contained images of people who had the archaic smile, as evidenced by statues found in excavations all across the Greek mainland, Asia Minor, and on islands in the Aegean Sea. The significance of the convention is not known although it is often assumed that for the Greeks, that kind of smile reflected a state of ideal health and well-being. It has also been suggested that it is simply the result of a technical difficulty in fitting the curved shape of the mouth to the somewhat-blocklike head typical of Archaic sculpture. Richard Neer theorizes that the archaic smile may actually be a marker of status, since aristocrats of multiple cities throughout Greece were referred to as the Geleontes or "smiling ones". There are alternative views to the archaic smile being "flat and quite unnatural looking". John Fowles describes the archaic smile in his novel The Magus as "full of the purest metaphysical good humour [...] timelessly intelligent and timelessly amused. [...] Because a star explodes and a thousand worlds like ours die, we know this world is. That is the smile: that what might not be, is [...] When I die, I shall have this by my bedside. It is the last human face I want to see."

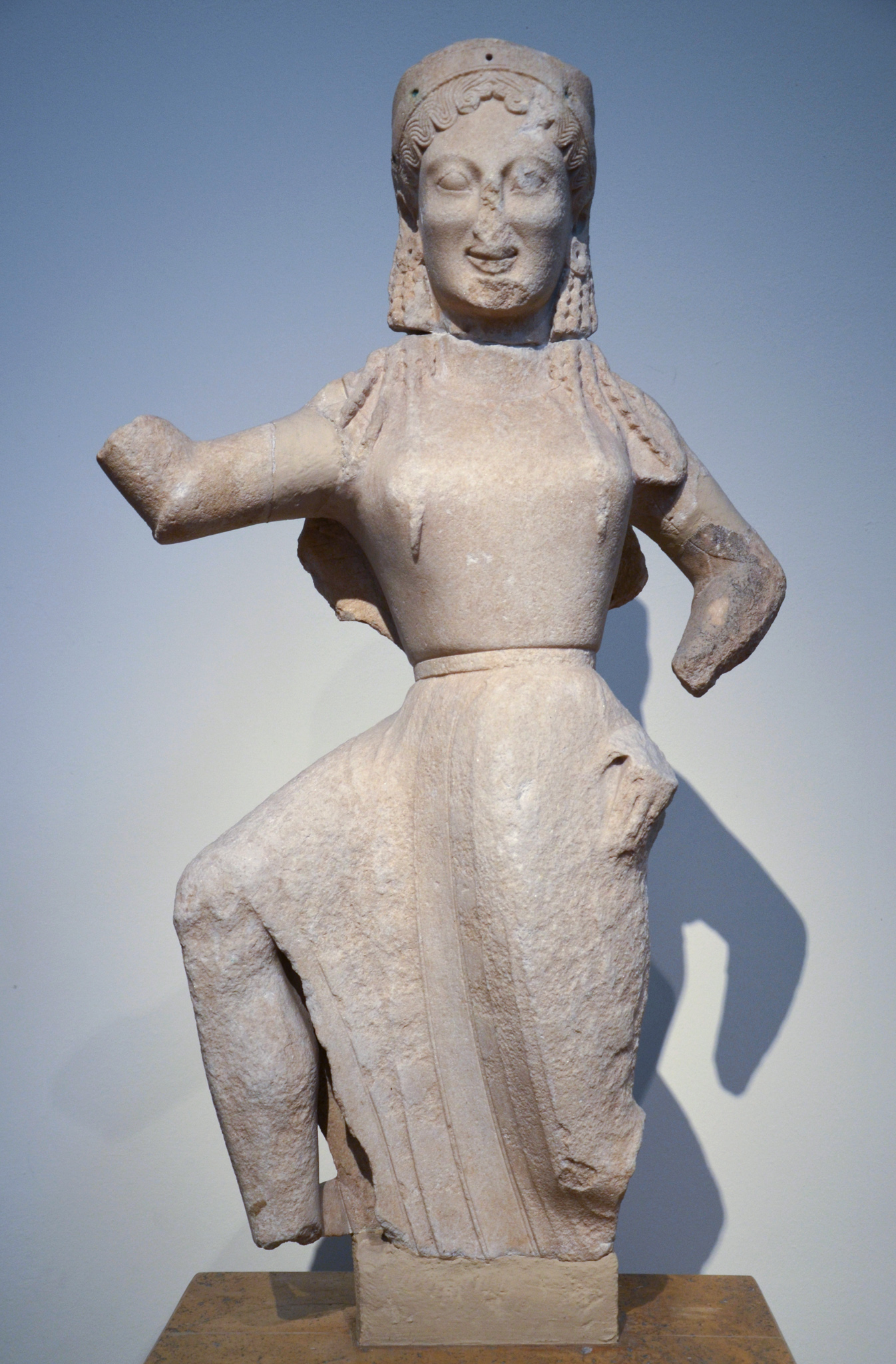
Statue of Nike from Delos, ca 550 BCE (National Archaeological Museum of Athens)

The Greek archaic smile is also found on Etruscan artworks during the same time period nearby on the west side of the Italian peninsula, as consequence of the influence of Greek art on Etruscan art. An example of this commonly featured in art history texts is the Sarcophagus of the Spouses, a terracotta work found in the necropolis of Cerveteri. It features a smiling couple reclined seemingly at a banquet. The slight geometric stylization, level of realism and physical scale are also strikingly similar to Greek works from this period featuring the archaic smile.

== Religious and sociopolitical context ==
The archaic smile is often interpreted as more than an artistic convention; it also reflects deeper religious and sociopolitical values of the time. Sculptures such as kouroi (youthful males) and korai (youthful females) were commonly used as votive offerings or grave markers, embodying the ideal human form and virtues esteemed by Greek society. These statues symbolized human aspiration to align with divine attributes, and the smile may have been a visual representation of spiritual harmony, divine favor, or readiness for the afterlife. The smile suggested that the subject had attained a state of well-being beyond mere mortality, indicating a peaceful existence balanced with the cosmos, in line with Greek beliefs about order and symmetry in both life and art.

In his 1958 commentary The Archaic Smile: A Commentary on the Arts in Times of Crisis, Francis Henry Taylor notes: "A smile appears on the faces of most archaic figures, a happiness of expression seeming to transcend that of human beings." Taylor's observation suggests that the archaic smile symbolized more than surface-level serenity; it represented an ideal that transcended human experience, embodying timeless dignity and emotional resilience. His interpretation connects the smile to a sense of permanence, which was especially significant during times of political instability and social change. The smile on these figures conveyed a sense of serenity, indicating an ideal state of being that endured through crises and hardship.

As the polis (city-state) developed and aristocratic power structures solidified, public art, including the commissioning of statues, became a means to display wealth, piety, and power. The archaic smile may have served as a marker of aristocratic virtue, signifying the subject's membership in the elite class. In this context, the smile reflected not only divine favor but also moral and spiritual righteousness. It was a symbol of the unity between beauty, virtue, and wisdom—ideals that permeated Archaic Greek thought.

== Philosophy and psychology ==
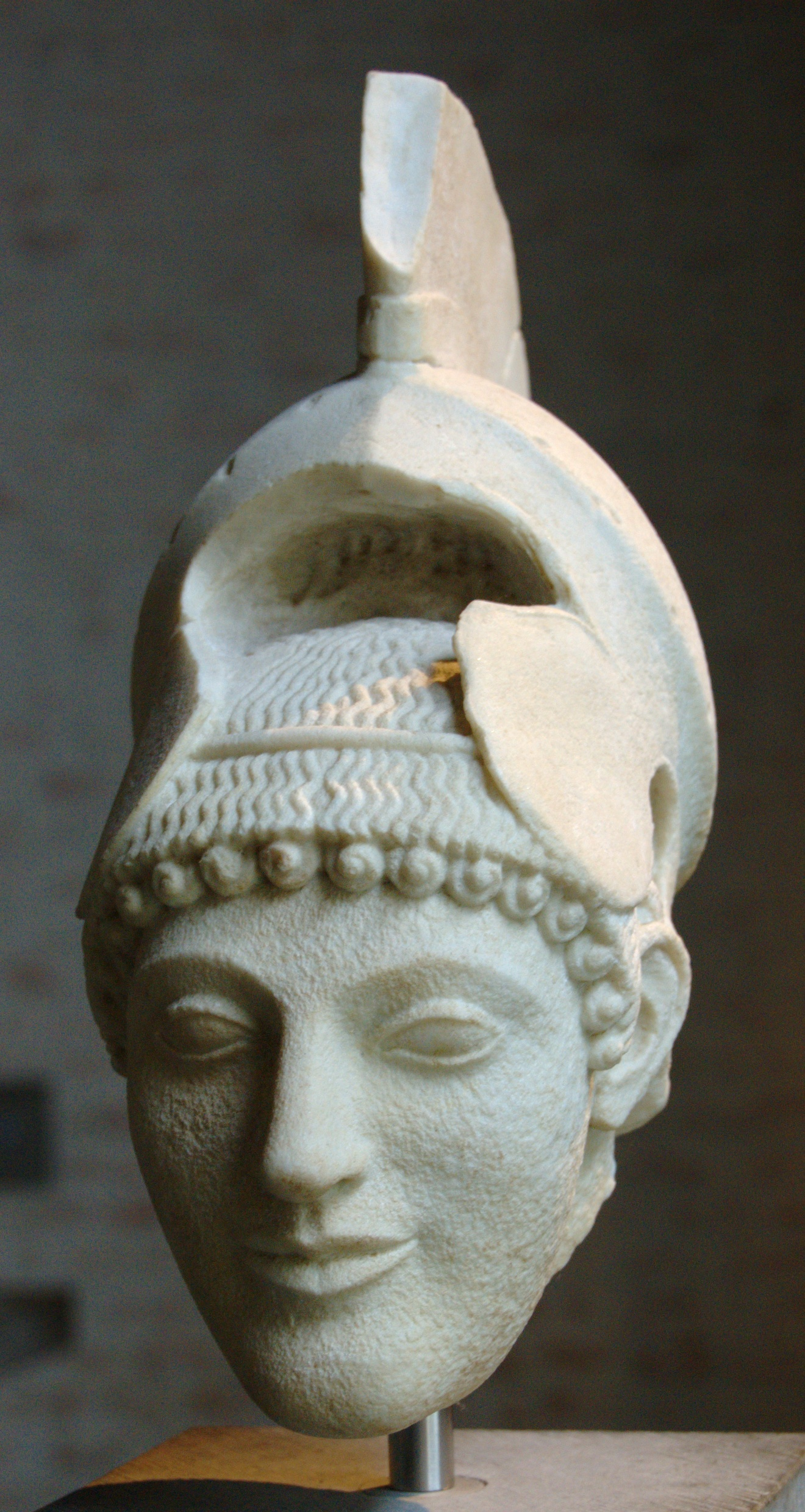
Warrior from the west pediment of the Temple of Aphaia, ca. 505–500 BCE (Glyptothek Munich)

Greek philosophy held that everything in the universe had an inherent order, and achieving internal harmony with this order was the highest good. The archaic smile, therefore, could symbolize not only physical well-being but also the subject's alignment with the cosmos. This connects to the Greek concept of kalokagathia, the unity of beauty and goodness, where external beauty reflected an internal moral or virtuous state. The smile was a visual cue of this inner perfection, signaling that the subject’s life, thoughts, and actions were in harmony with the divine order.

Art in ancient Greece sought to represent an idealized version of human nature. Sculptures from this period, such as the kouros and korai, were not meant to be lifelike portraits but symbolic representations of the human form in its most perfect, harmonious state. The archaic smile played a key role in this idealization, conveying the subject's spiritual and moral elevation. Unlike later periods, where artists began to explore a greater range of emotions and psychological depth in their figures, the archaic smile focused more on outward perfection than inner turmoil or complex emotions.

From a psychological perspective, the archaic smile may represent an early attempt to capture an idealized human experience, long before modern psychology provided nuanced concepts of emotional life. Greek artists used art not just as representation but as a vehicle for expressing philosophical ideas about human nature. While we might look for psychological depth in facial expressions today, the archaic smile symbolized a philosophical ideal—an outward sign of serenity and stability.

The archaic smile reflects the Greek view of human nature as something that could achieve harmony and perfection. Through this smile, Greek artists communicated a deeper philosophical concept: that true human excellence was about aligning oneself with divine order.

== Gallery ==
Head of Artemis, ca. 600 BCE (Cleveland Museum of Art)

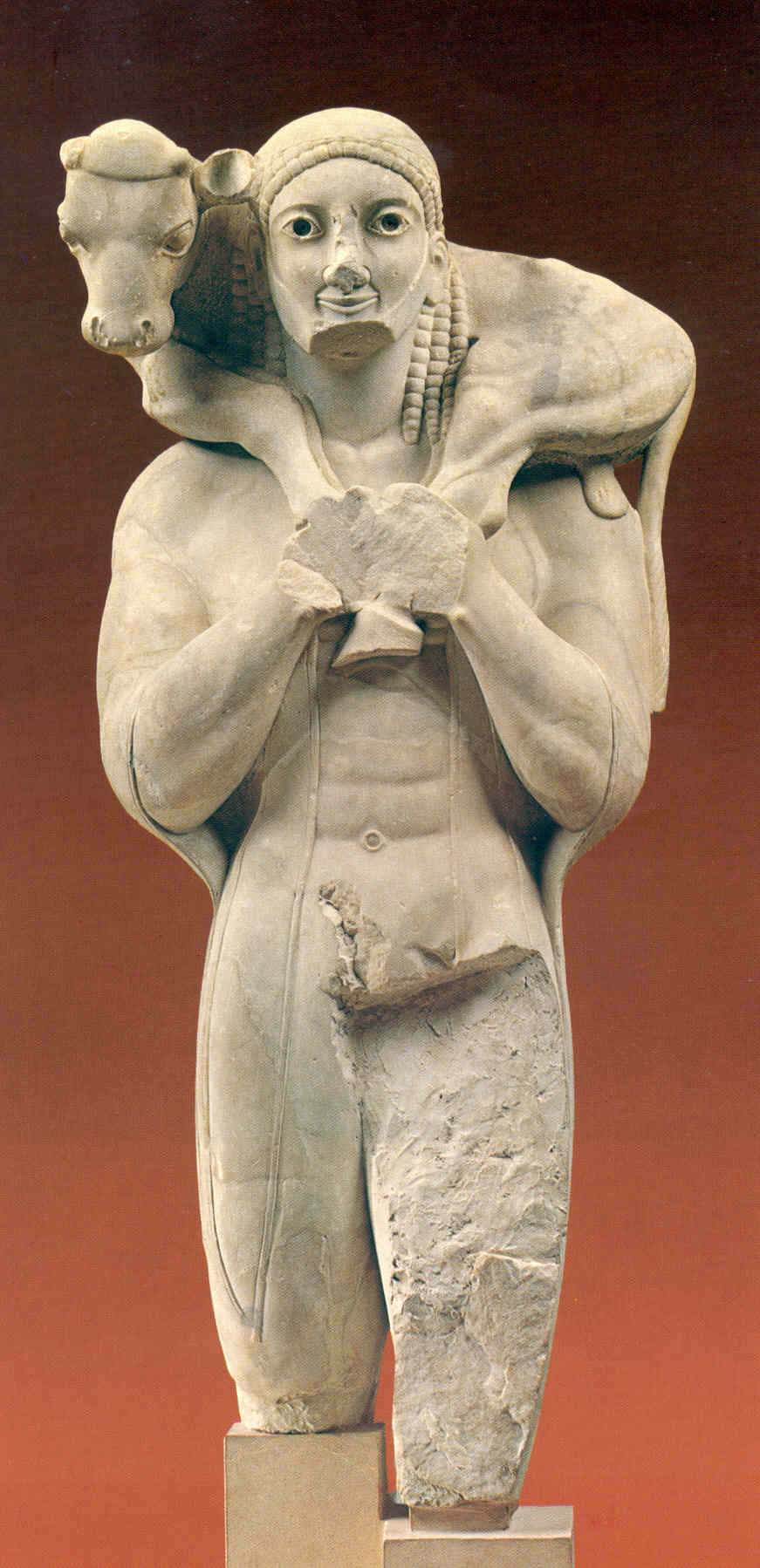
The Moscophoros of the Acropolis, ca. 570 BCE (Acropolis Museum)

Head of a kouros from Eleusis, ca. 560 BCE (National Archaeological Museum of Athens)

Kouros from Merenda, ca. 550–530 BCE (National Archaeological Museum of Athens)

Votive sphinx from the Acropolis, ca. 540–530 BCE (Acropolis Museum)

== See also ==
- Ancient Greek art
- Baekje smile
