= Rock-carved triad buddha in Seosan =

Sculpture in Seosan, South Korea

Coordinates: 36.4405°N 126.6052°E

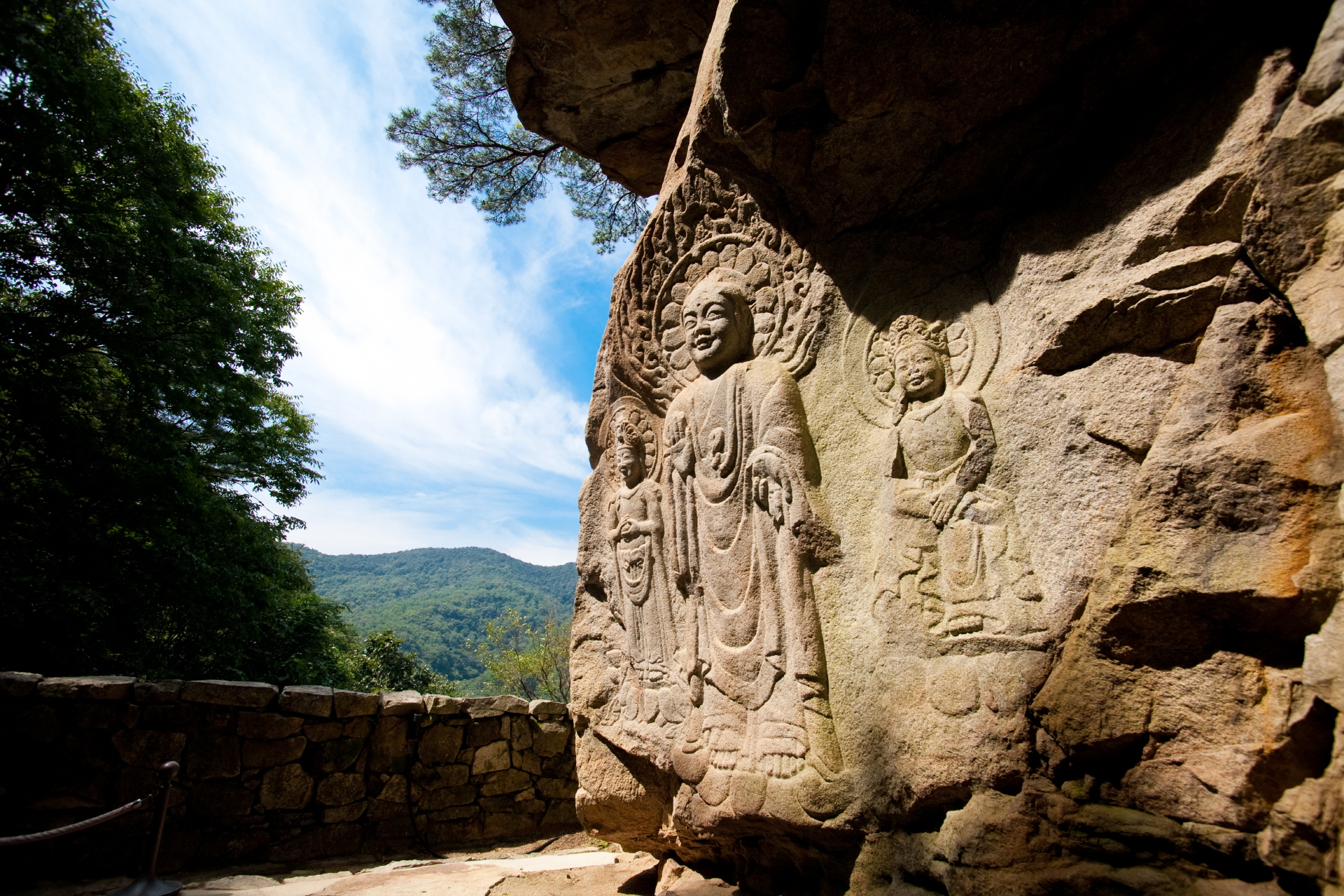

Korean name
- Hangul: 서산 용현리 마애여래삼존상
- Hanja: 瑞山龍賢里磨崖如來三尊像
- Revised Romanization: Seosan Yonghyeolli Maaeyeorae Samjonsang
- McCune–Reischauer: Sŏsan Yonghyŏlli Maaeyŏrae Samjonsang

The Rock-carved triad buddha in Seosan (Korean: 서산 용현리 마애여래삼존상) is located at Gayasan, Unsan-myeon, Seosan, South Chungcheong Province. The Standing Buddha Reborn was sculptured in the center which is 208 centimeter high, with a standing image of a bodhisattva on his right side and an image of the Bangasayusang on his left side. It is also known as "the smile of the Baekje", and it is considered to be a notable example of Buddhist images carved on rock cliffs and which were made by digging into the natural rocks and sculpting the statue.

== Features ==
The Standing Buddha Reborn has a fleshy face, eyes "like an apricot pit," a shallow, large nose and a smiling mouth. It displays the merciful impression which is a feature of statues of Baekje kingdom. Because his robe is thick, it doesn't show his silhouette and has folds of repeated U-patterns. At the back of the head the round halo-like nimbus has lotus flowers inscribed in its center and flame patterns at the border.

On the left of the carving, the standing bodhisattva is wearing a crown. He has a chubby face like the image of the principal Buddha and seems to be smiling with his entire face. His upper body is decorated with a necklace and his lower body is covered with a skirt that extends to his ankles.

On the right side, the sitting bodhisattva also smiles with his entire face, which is round and fleshy. Both of his arms were seriously damaged, but it still displays sophisticated carving skills in his left hand grasping his right ankle and his jaw resting in his right hand.

It is believed that the carving is an expression of the principal Buddha and Maitreya bodhisattva introduced in the "Lotus Sutra". It is estimated to have been created between the late 6th and the early 7th centuries, due to the commonness in that period of heavy, dignified physiques and the round, clear cuts exhibited in the principal Buddha statue, and the refined sense of molding in the bodhisattva statue, as well as the liveliness of the image.

== Cultural significance ==
This area was a passage through the Taean peninsula which was a center of traffic traveling to and from China and the Baekje and Buyeo kingdoms. As such, this artwork is considered to show the active cultural exchange between China and Baekje.

== Factsheet ==
Rock-carved triad buddha in Seosan
Classification	National Treasures 84 (South Korea)
Kind of Cultural Properties	Rock-carved Buddhist Statues (Unmovable Property)
Address	2–1, Yonghyeon-ri, Unsan-myeon, Seosan, Chungcheongnam-do
Age	Late Baekje Period

== See also ==
- National Treasures of South Korea
- Baekje
- Seosan
- Korean Buddhist sculpture
- Korean Buddhism
