= Koutalas, Corinthia =

Koutalas Κουταλάς
- Community
- Location within Greece
- Coordinates: 37°50′N 22°51′E
- Country: Greece
- Administrative region: Peloponnese
- Regional unit: Corinthia
- Municipality: Corinth
- Municipal unit: Tenea

Population (2021)
  - Community: 578
- Time zone: UTC+2 (EET)
  - Summer (DST): UTC+3 (EEST)
- Vehicle registration: ΚΡ

Koutalas (Greek: Κουταλάς) is a rural village and a community in southern Corinthia, Greece. It is part of the municipal unit of Tenea. In 2021 its population was 578 for the community, which consists of the villages Koutalas, Mapsos and Spathovouni. Koutalas is situated on a hillside, 3 km northwest of Chiliomodi, 5 km northeast of Agios Vasileios and 14 km southwest of Corinth. Koutalas suffered damage from the 2007 Greek forest fires.

== See also ==
- List of settlements in Corinthia
