= Kouros of Tenea =

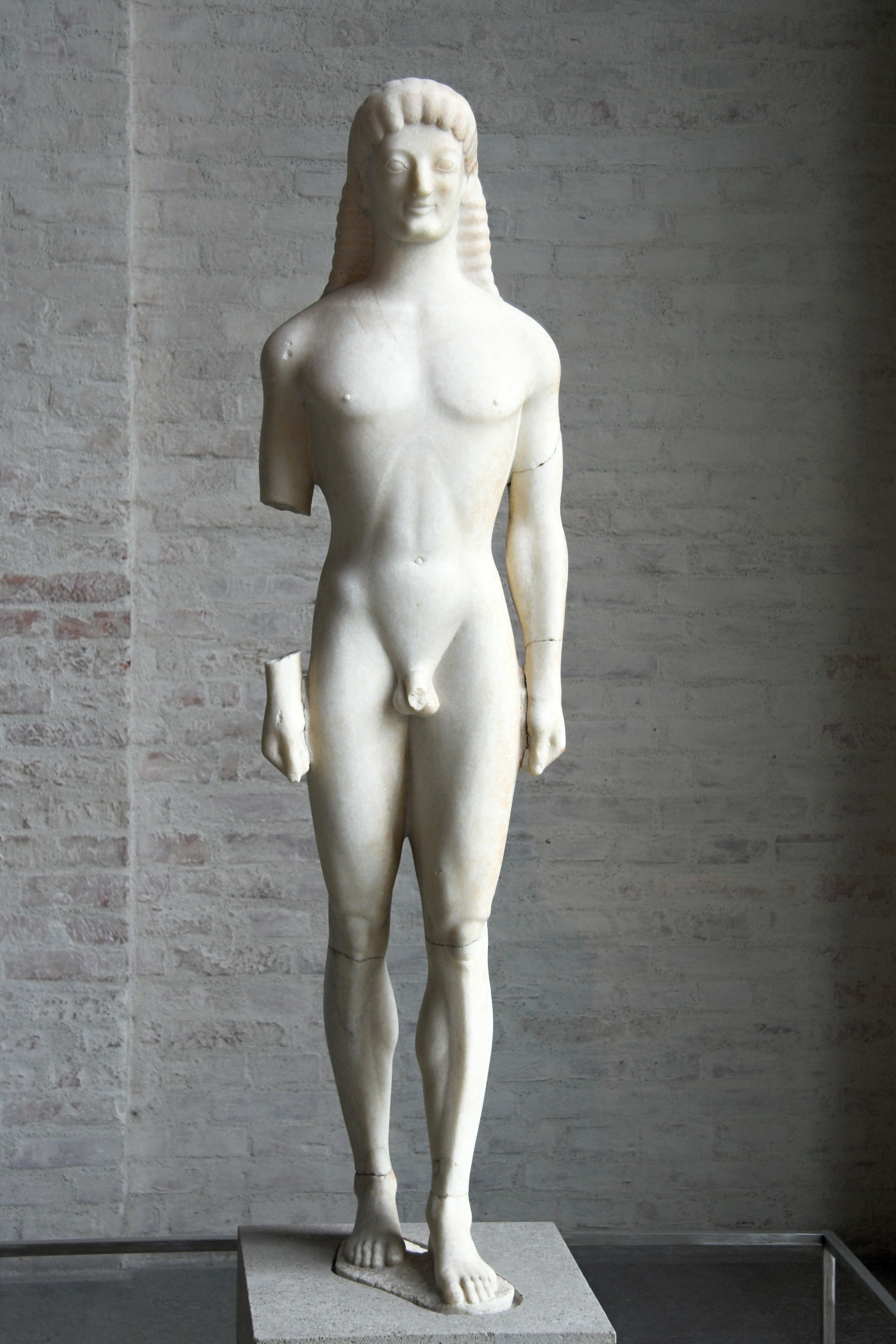
Kouros of Tenea

The grave statue of a youth from Tenea known as the Kouros of Tenea (formerly Apollo of Tenea) is now located in the Glyptothek in Munich, Germany.

The archaic Kouros was created in North-East Peloponnese about 560 BC. The Parian marble statue was discovered in an ancient cemetery in 1846, approximately twenty kilometers South of Ancient Corinth at the site of ancient Tenea. The Kouros was acquired by the Glyptothek in 1853. Some casts of the statue feature an intact right formarm, this was a late-19th century restoration which was later removed.
