= Serifos =

Greek island in the Aegean Sea

Serifos Σέριφος
- Municipality
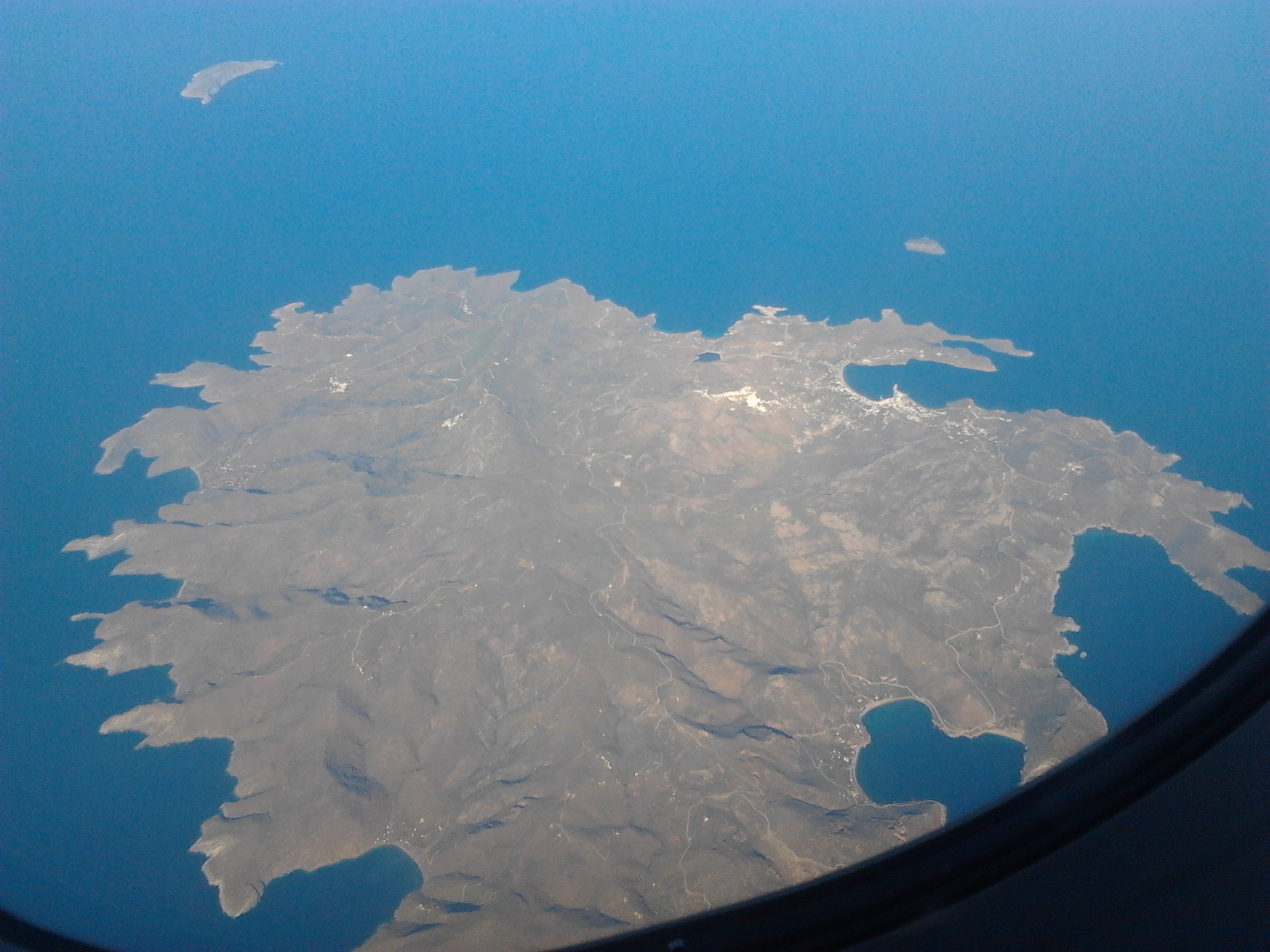
- Airview

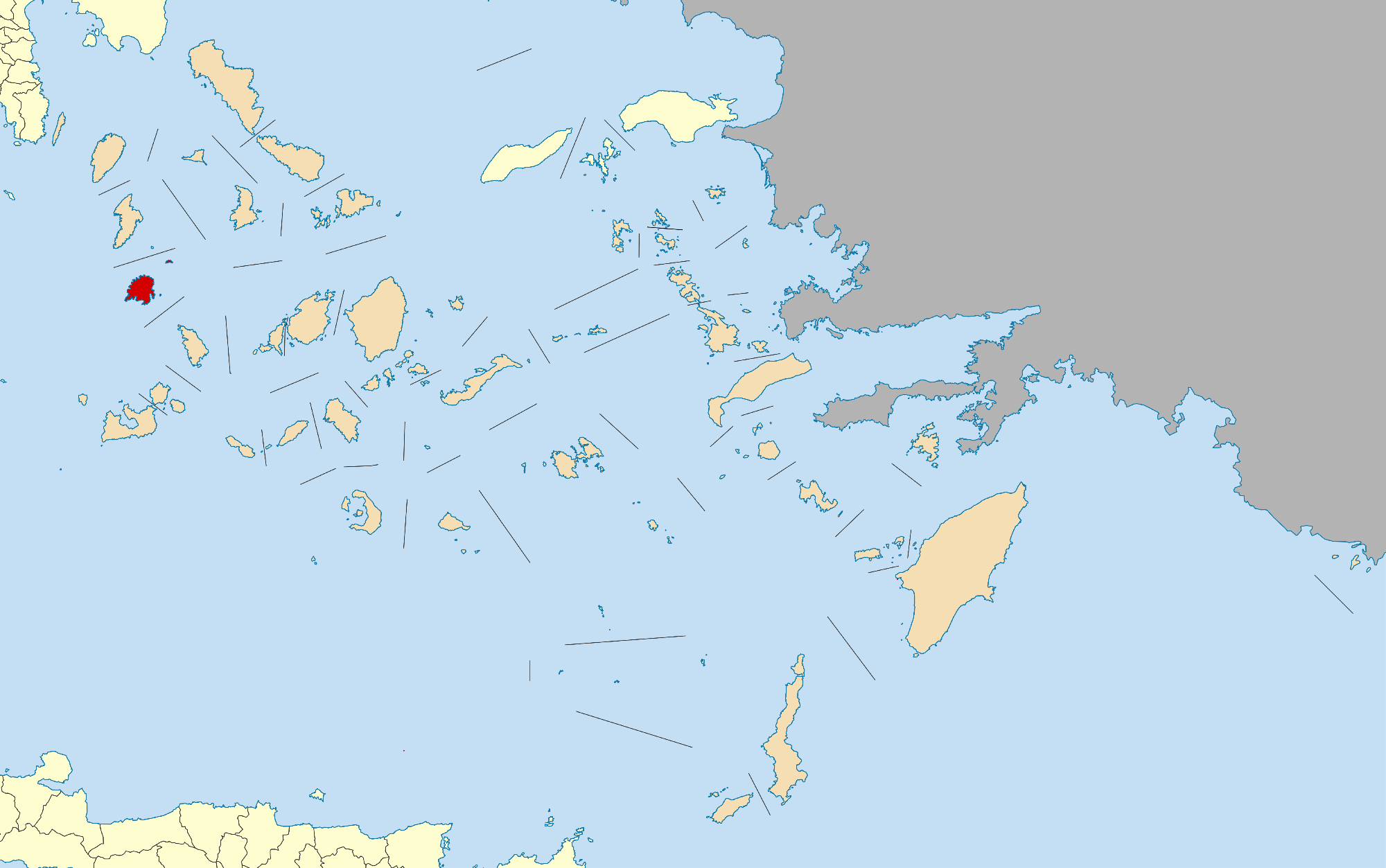

- Location within Greece
- Coordinates: 37°09′N 24°30′E
- Country: Greece
- Administrative region: South Aegean
- Regional unit: Milos

Government
  - Mayor: Konstantinos Revinthis (since 2019)

Area
  - Municipality: 75.21 km^{2} (29.04 sq mi)
- Highest elevation: 585 m (1,919 ft)
- Lowest elevation: 0 m (0 ft)

Population (2021)
  - Municipality: 1,241
  - Density: 16.50/km^{2} (42.74/sq mi)
- Time zone: UTC+2 (EET)
  - Summer (DST): UTC+3 (EEST)
- Postal code: 840 05
- Area code: 22810
- Vehicle registration: EM
- Website: www.serifos.gr

Serifos (Greek: Σέριφος) is a Greek island in the Aegean Sea, located in the western Cyclades, south of Kythnos and northwest of Sifnos. It is part of the Milos regional unit. The area is 75.207 square kilometres (29.038 sq mi) and the population was 1,241 at the 2021 census. It is located about 170 kilometres (92 nautical miles) ESE of the Athenian port of Piraeus.

In Greek mythology, Serifos is where Danaë and her infant son Perseus washed ashore after her father Acrisius, in response to an oracle that his own grandson would kill him, set them adrift at sea in a wooden chest. When Perseus returned to Serifos with the head of the Gorgon Medusa, he turned Polydektes, the king of Serifos, and his retainers into stone as punishment for the king's attempt to marry his mother by force.

In antiquity, the island was proverbial for the alleged muteness of its frogs. During the Roman imperial period, Serifos was a place of exile. After 1204 it became a minor dependency of the Venetian dukes of the Archipelago. In the late 19th century Serifos experienced a modest economic boom from the exploitation of the island's extensive iron ore deposits. The mines closed in the 1960s, and Serifos now depends on tourism and small-scale agriculture.

== Antiquities ==
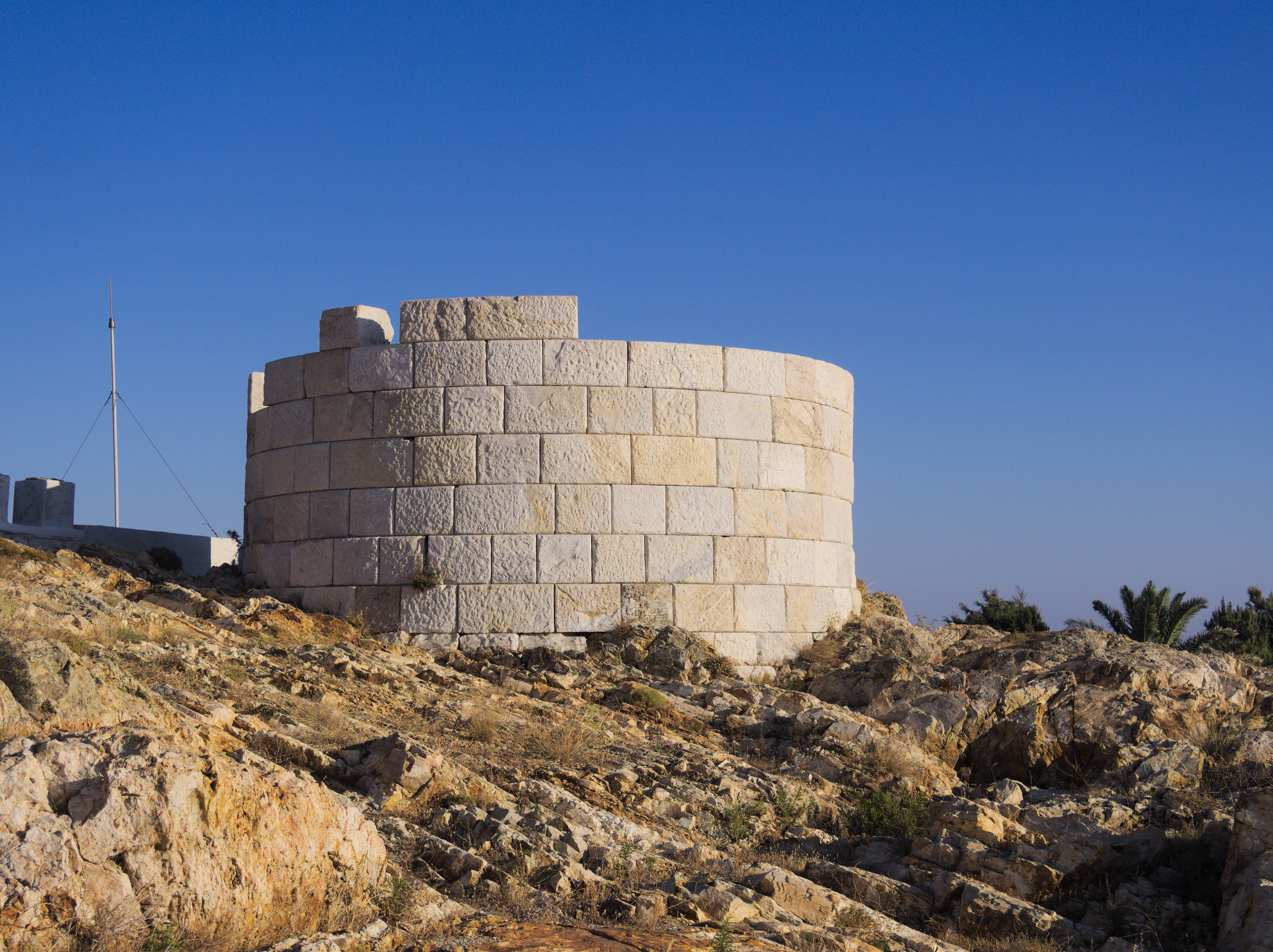
The Hellenistic White Tower of Serifos

Worked blocks of island marble built into the walls of the medieval castle crowning Chora, the hilltop main town of Serifos, show that the ancient capital was there as well. Chance finds, primarily marble funerary sculpture, are displayed in the Archaeological Collection in Chora (open Tues.-Sun.).

The most impressive ancient monument is the Aspros Pýrgos (Άσπρος Πύργος), a Hellenistic marble watchtower (c. 300 BC) with walls preserved to 2 m. and an interior staircase, standing on a hilltop just east of the road from Chora to Mega Livadi, near Mega Chorio. Work began in 2011 to study the fallen blocks for an eventual reconstruction.

At least four other ancient towers have been located, including the megalithic Psaros Pyrgos (Ψαρός Πύργος) or "Couch of the Cyclops" in the SW corner of the island. The so-called "Castle of the Old Lady" (Κάστρο της Γριάς) above Ganema and Koutalas preserves scant remains of a collapsed dry-stone construction in a notch below the twin rocky summits. Rough fragments of white marble and rooftile, and archaic fine-ware potsherds on the SE terraces of the hillside suggest the existence of an ancient sanctuary.

The fortified Monastery of the Taxiarchs, dedicated to the Archangels Michael and Gabriel, was built in 1572 just outside the village of Galani. The sole monk is Archimandrite Makarios, who entered the monastery as a youth in 1958 and continues to maintain it.

=== Churches gallery ===
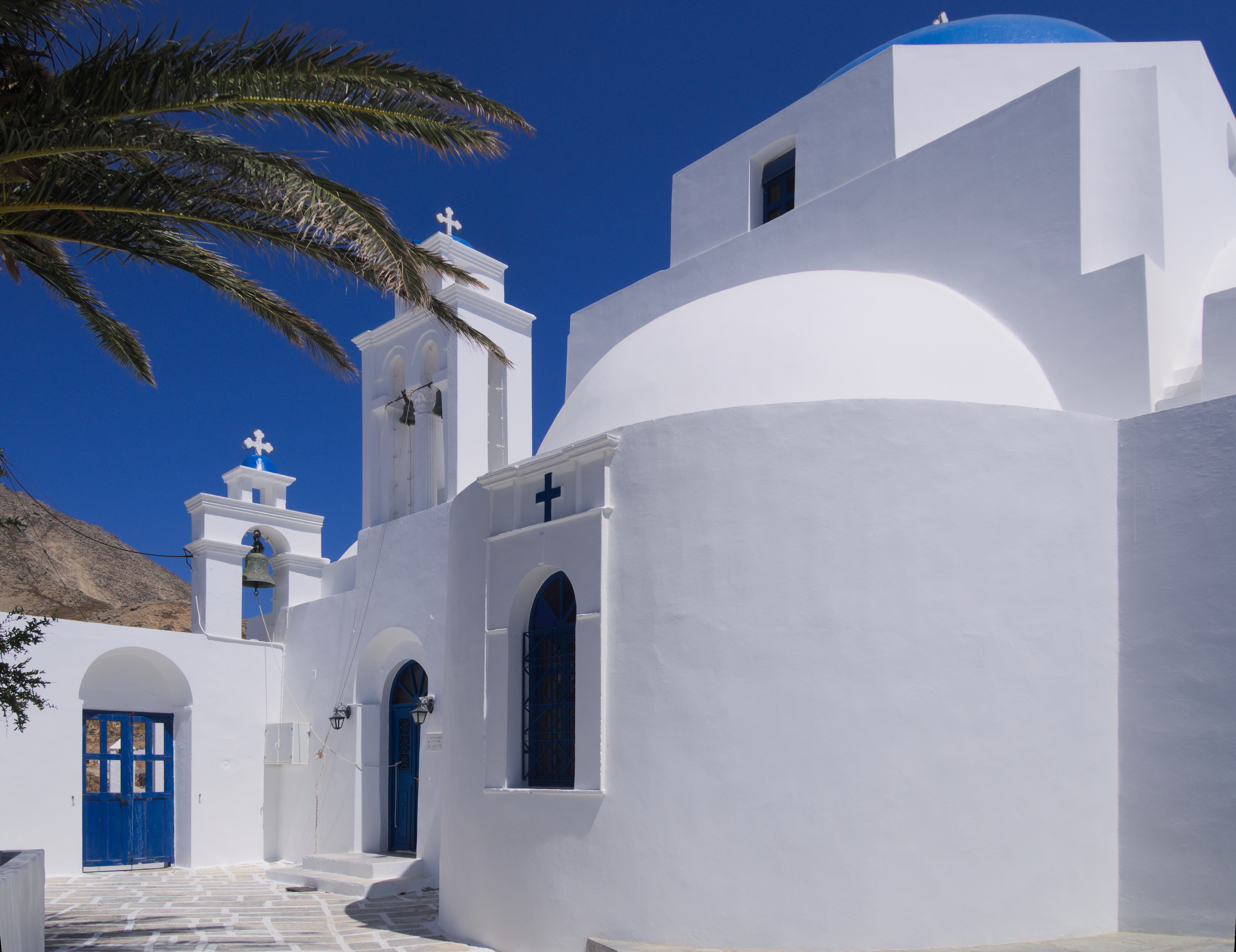
St Athanasius, Piatsa

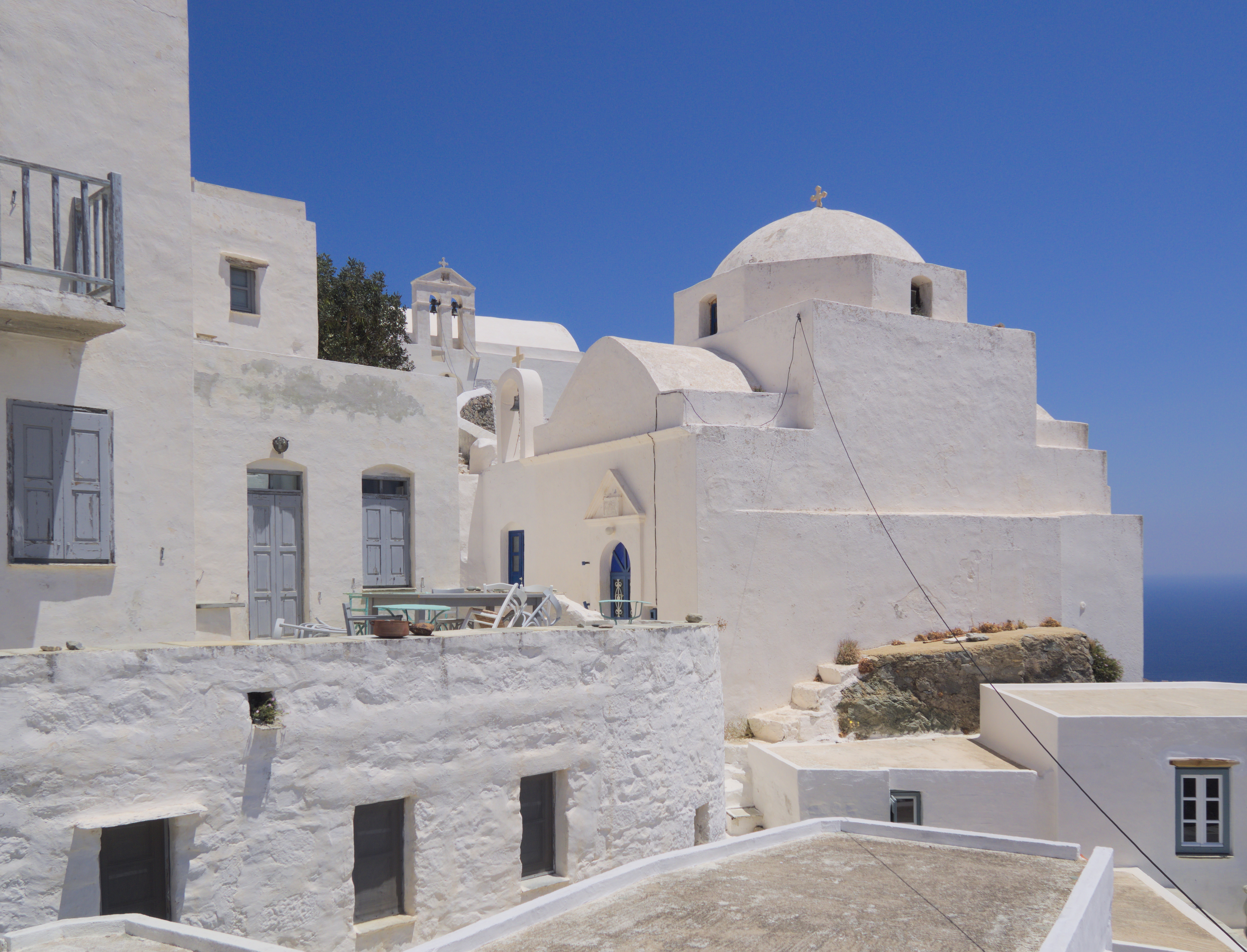
Church of Christ

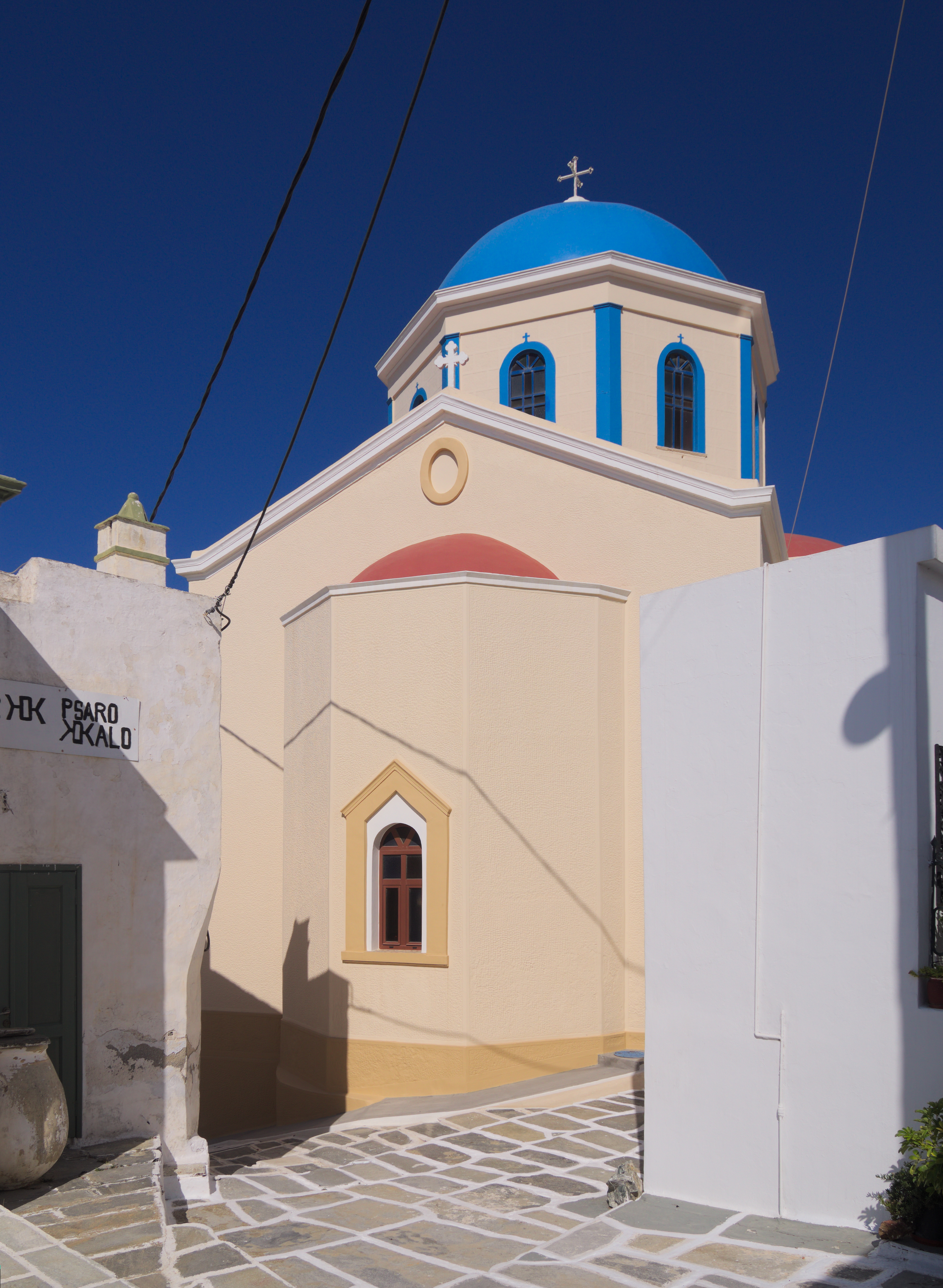
Evangelistria church, Kato Chora

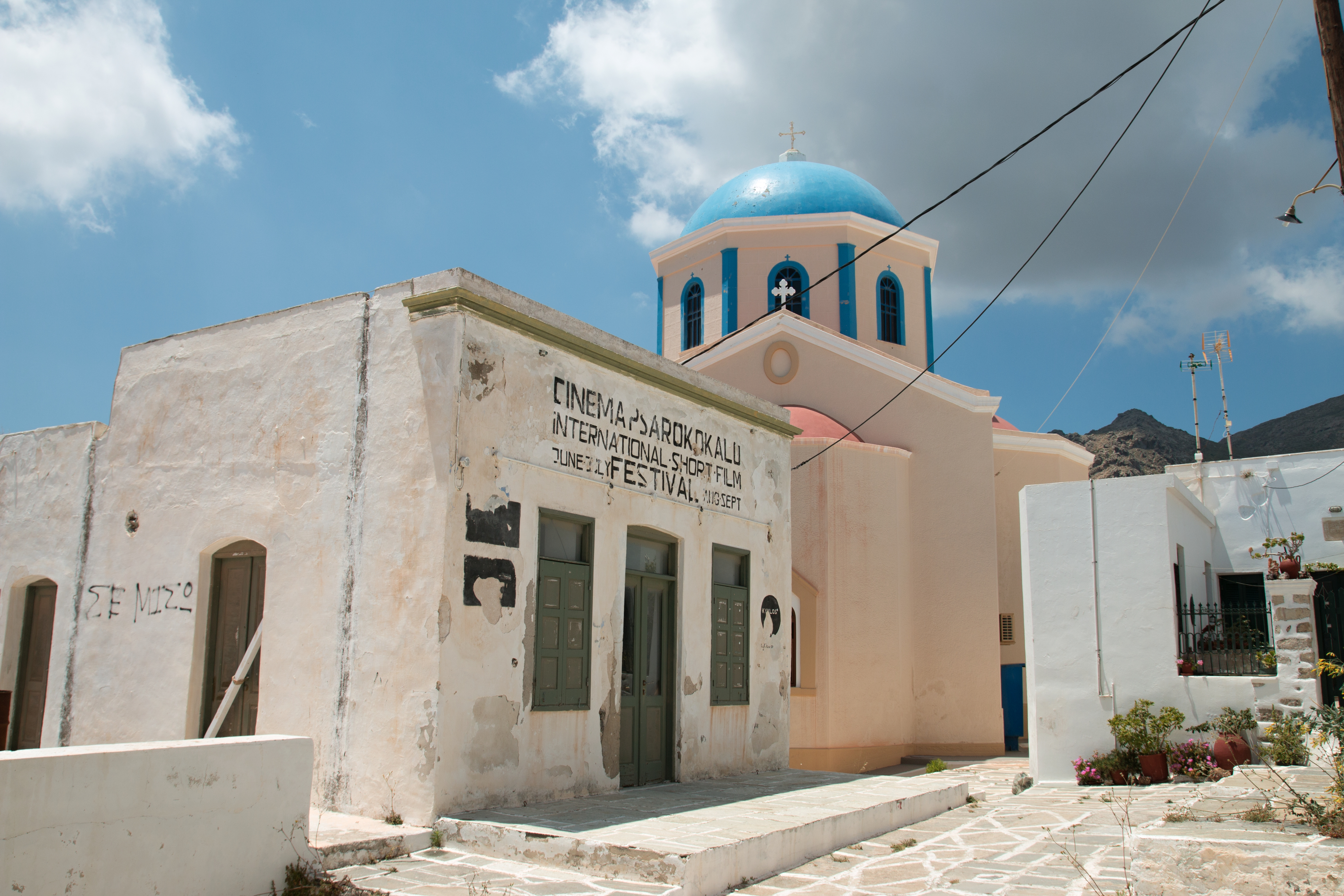
Evangelistria, Kato Chora

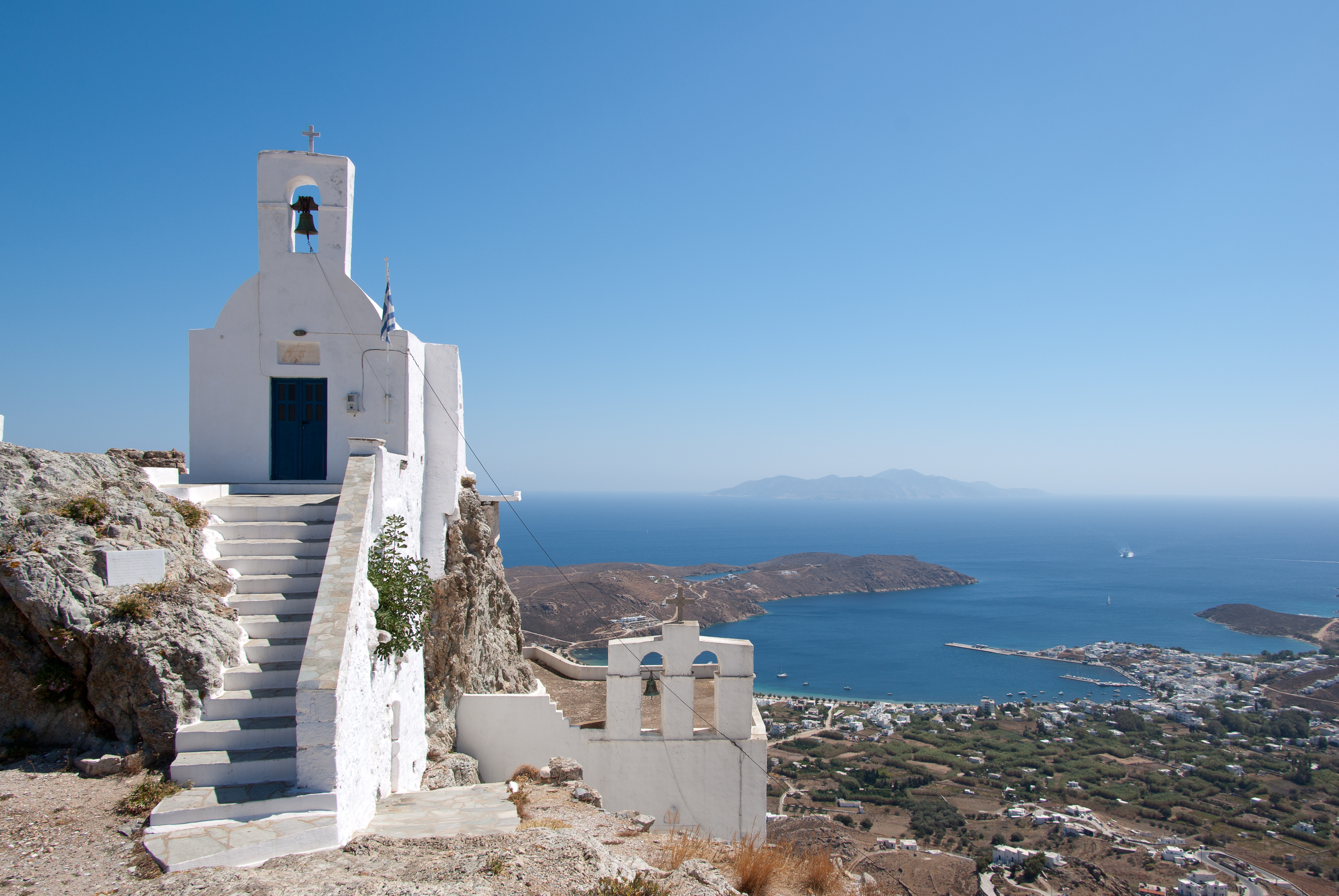
Agios Konstantinos church

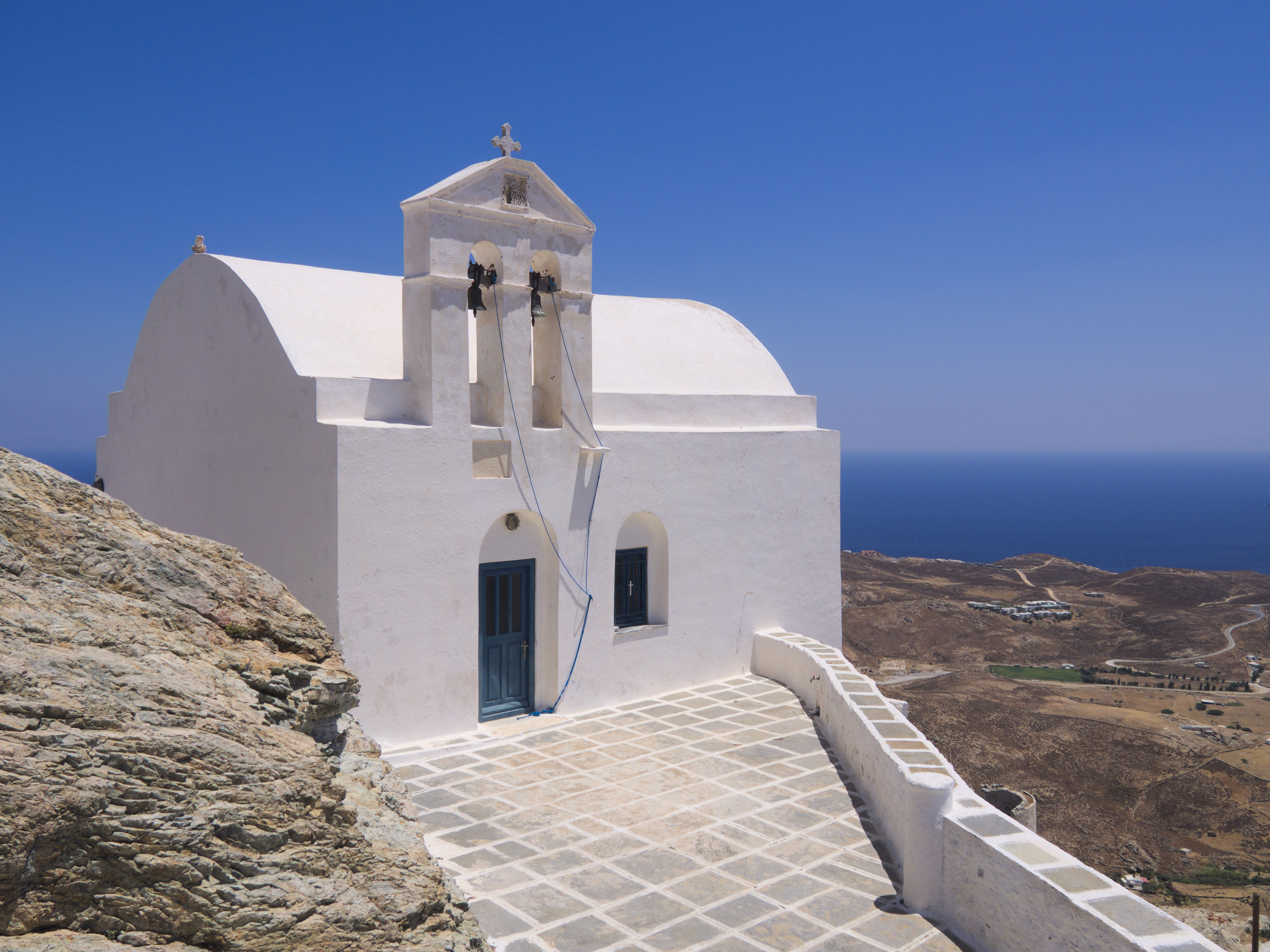
Agia Varvara church, Chora

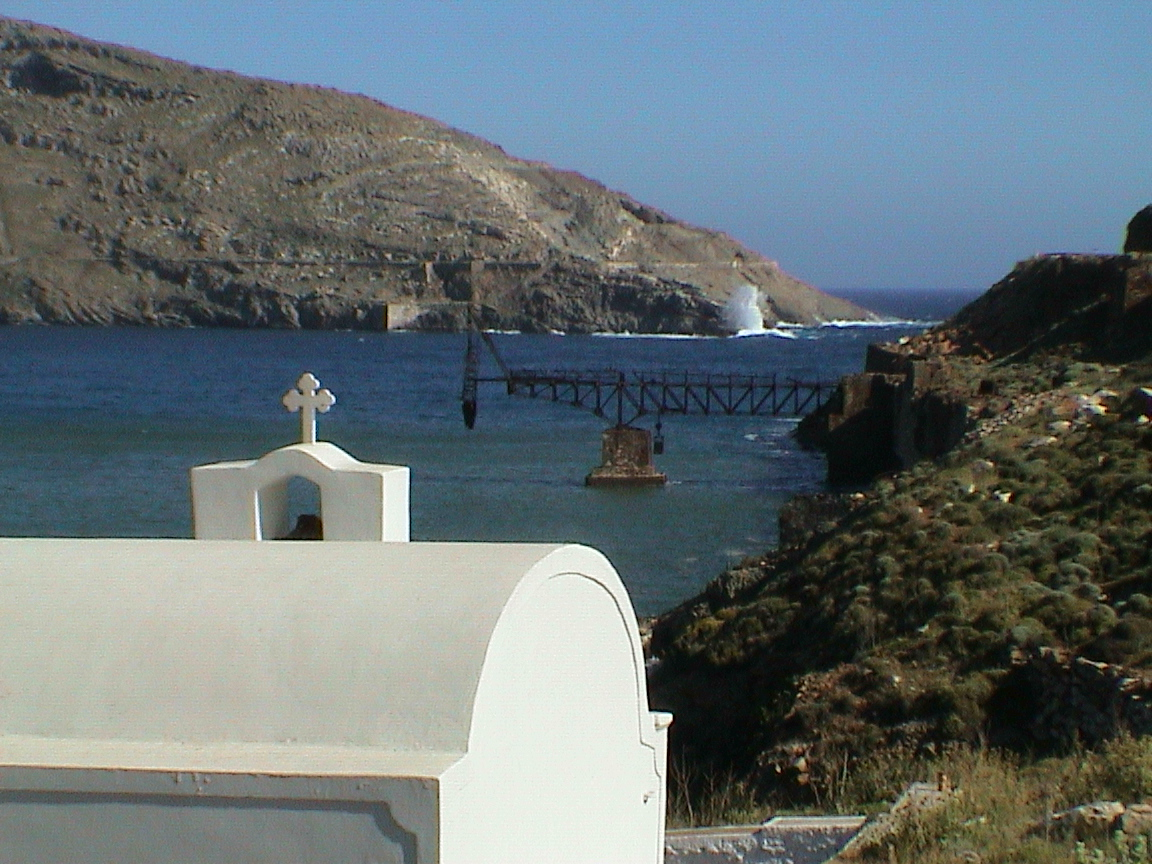
Agia Theodora, Koutalas

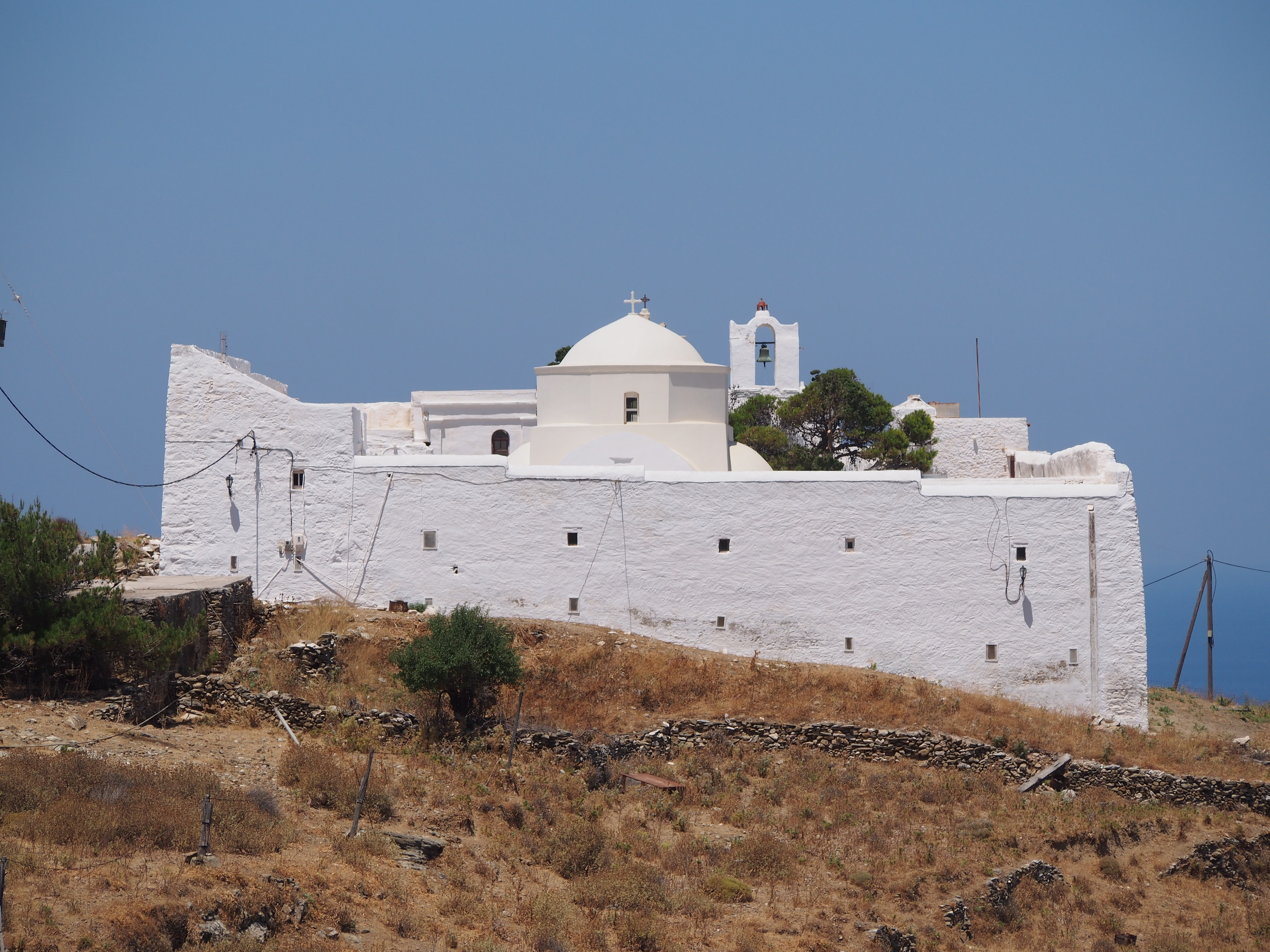
Monastery of Taxiarches

== History ==
=== Antiquity ===
Serifos was colonized by Ionians from Athens, and it was one of the few islands which refused submission to Xerxes I. By subsequent writers, Serifos is almost always mentioned with contempt on account of its poverty and insignificance and it was for this reason employed by the Roman emperors as a place of banishment for state criminals. It is curious that the ancient writers make no mention of the iron and copper mines of Serifos, which were, however, worked in antiquity, as is evident from existing traces, and which, one might have supposed, would have bestowed some prosperity upon the island. But though the ancient writers are silent about the mines, they are careful to relate that the frogs of Serifos differ from the rest of their fraternity by being mute.

=== Middle ages ===
Serifos was part of the Byzantine Empire until 1204 , when the island came under Venetian rule. During this time the mines reopened, after about 1,000 years of inactivity. In 1394, a strike of the miners against Nikolaos Adoldos occurred.

=== 19th and 20th centuries ===
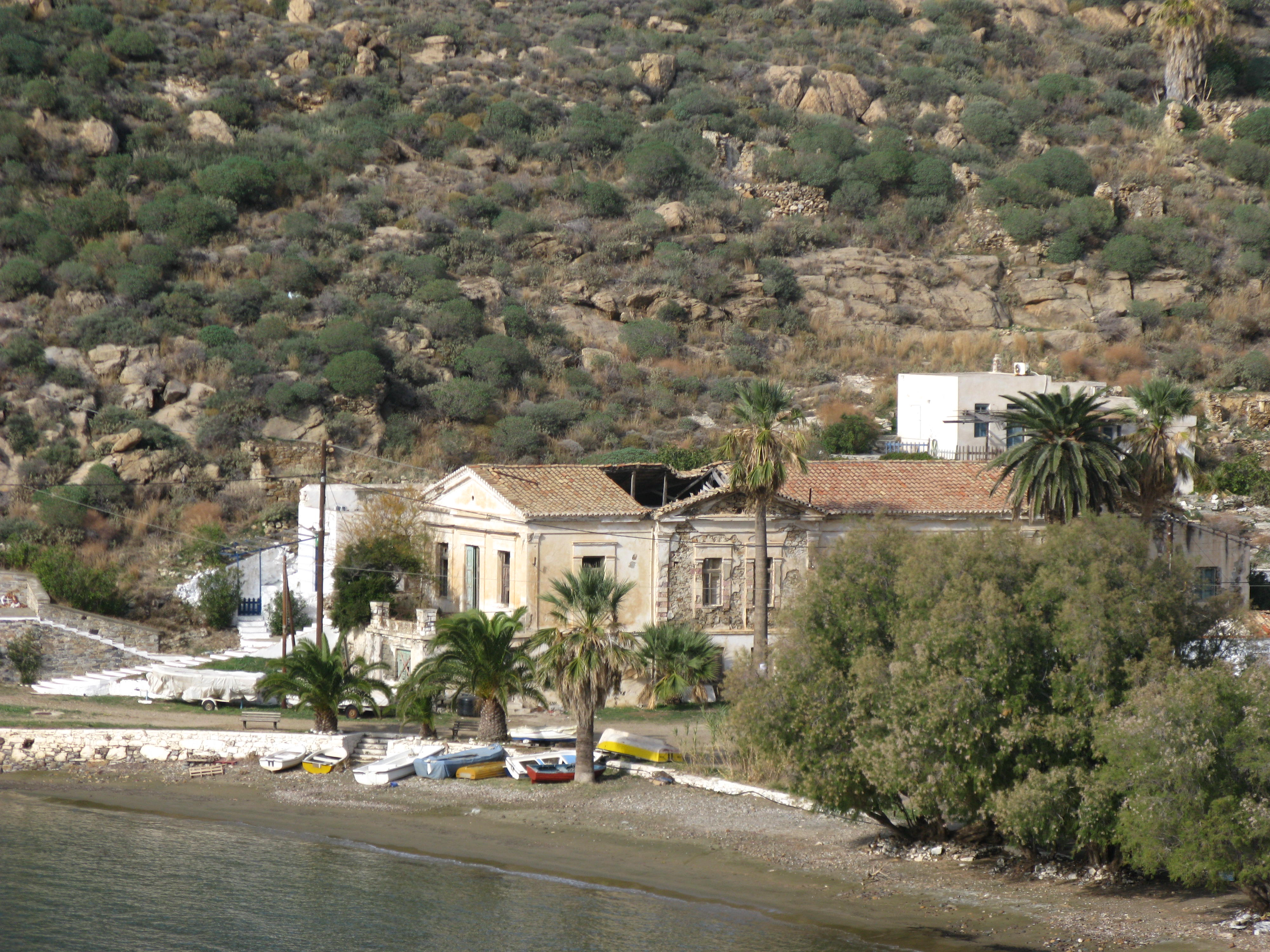
Headquarters of the former mine company of Serifos in Megalo Livadi

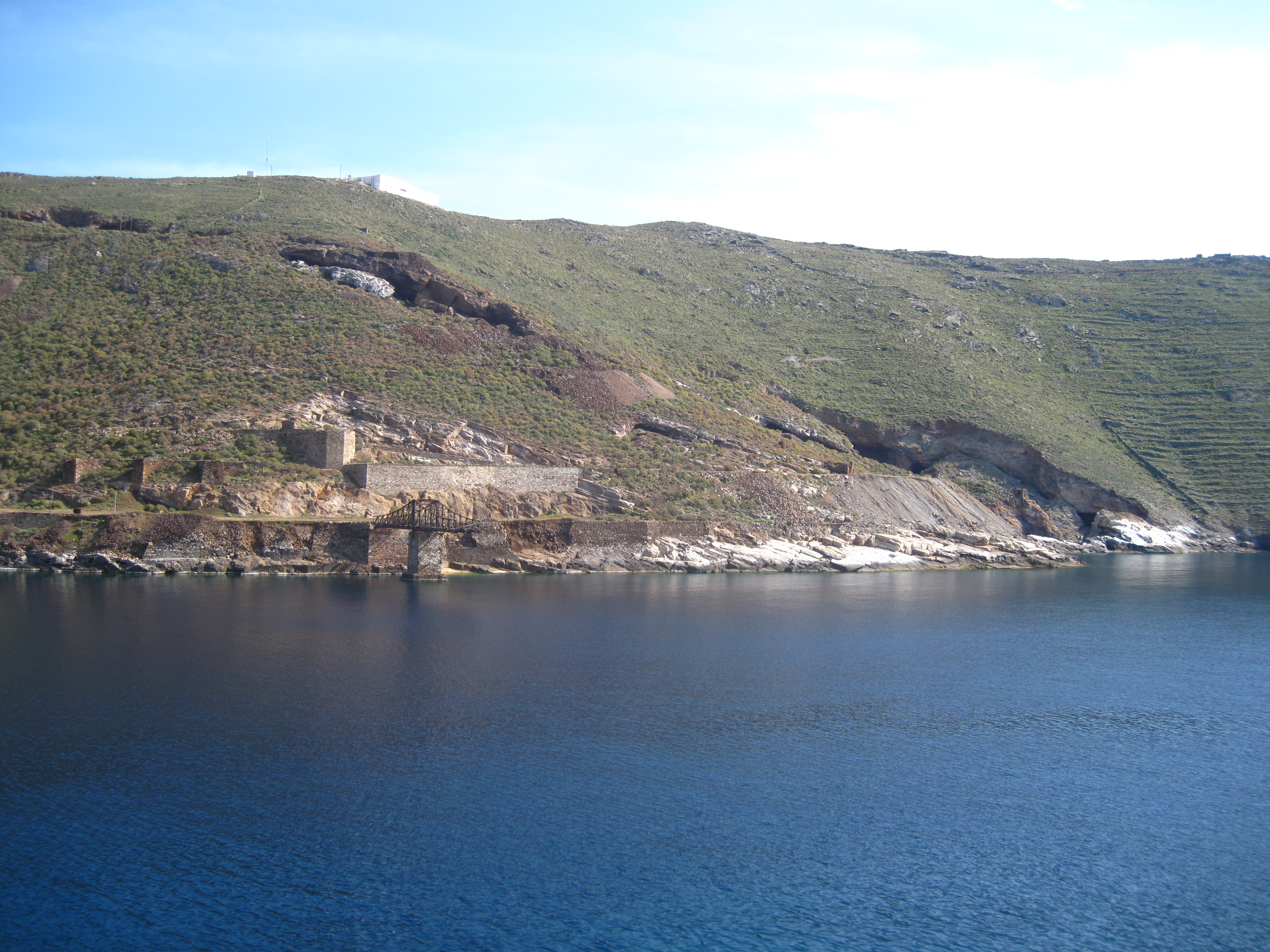
The mines

British travellers Theodore and Mabel Bent visited the island in December 1883. Bent opens his 1885 travelogue on the Cyclades with Serifos, although the couple visited Syros first.

In the 20th century, the mines of Serifos were exploited by the mining company "Société des mines de Seriphos-Spiliazeza," under the direction of German mineralogist A. Grohmann (died 1905). In the summer of 1916, in response to low pay, excessive working hours, unsafe conditions, and the company's refusal to rehire workers who had been drafted into the Greek army and recently demobilized, the 460 miners formed a union and organized a strike. Their leader was Constantinos Speras, a Serifos native educated in Egypt, who was an anarcho-syndicalist with long experience of labor struggles on the Greek mainland. In response to the strike, Grohman asked for the help of Greek authorities, who sent a 30-man gendarmerie (Χωροφυλακή) detachment from nearby Kea. After detaining Speras and the strike committee, the gendarmerie lieutenant ordered his men to fire on the workers, who had gathered at the ore loading dock at Megalo Livadi and refused to permit a cargo ship to be loaded. Four workers were killed and a dozen wounded. The workers, supported by their wives, attacked the gendarmes with stones, killing three of them and routing the others. The freed leadership took control of island institutions and sent a message placing Serifos under protection of the French fleet at Milos. This effort at collective self-organisation was cut short by the refusal of the French navy to intervene, and by the arrival of a Greek warship. Speras was arrested and charged with high treason, but released a few months later when the royalist government was ousted. Grohmann was given once again the control of the mines, after granting improved working conditions and an 8-hour workday.

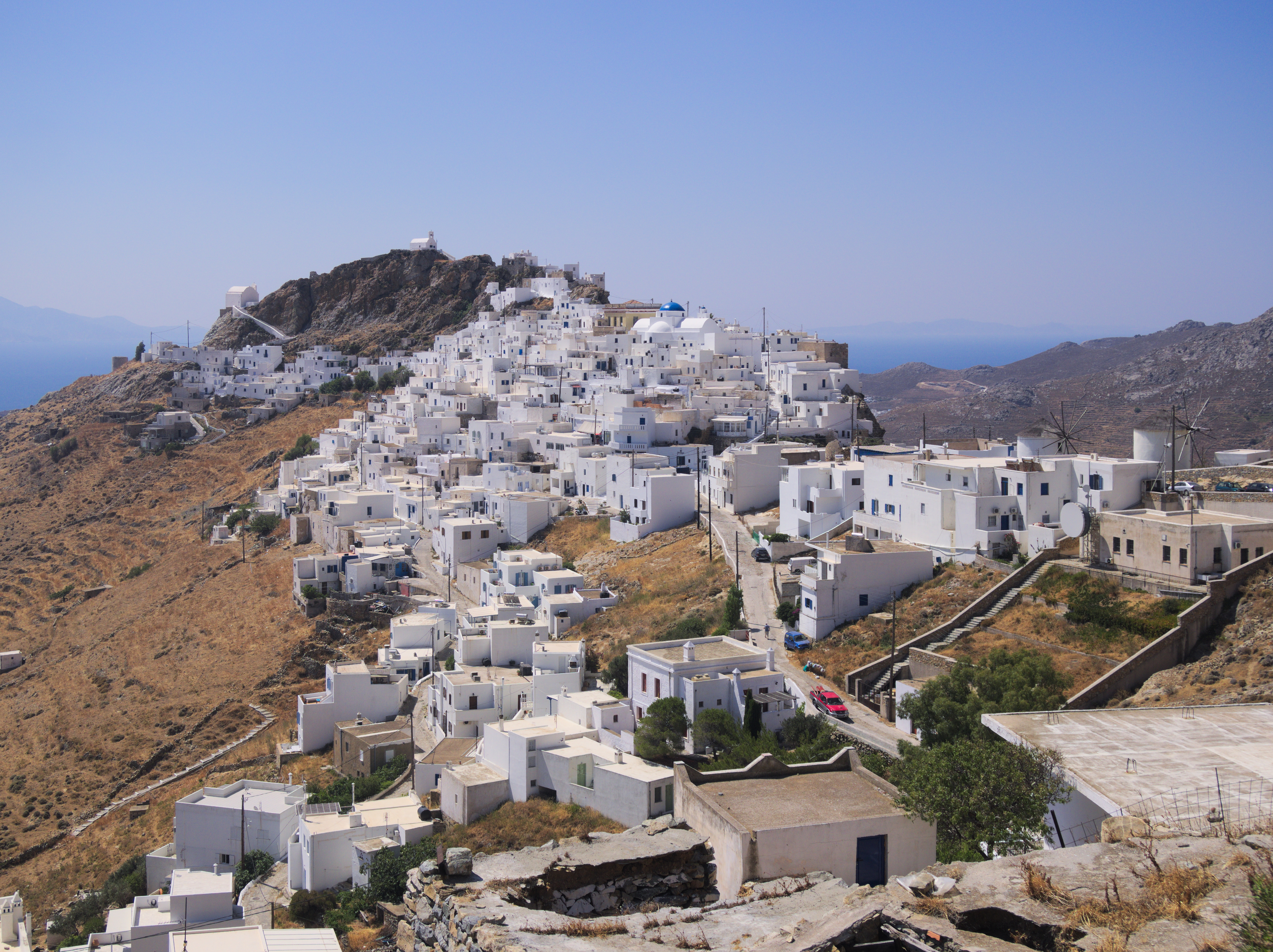
Chora, view from the north

== Historical population ==
Year	Island population
1981	1,133
1991	1,095
2001	1,414
2011	1,420
2021	1,241

== Communities ==
- Galani
- Kallitsos
- Koutalas
- Livadi Serifou
- Mega Chorio
- Mega Livadi
- Panagia
- Sykamia
- Serifos (town) or Chora

== See also ==
- Communities of the Cyclades
