= Mithymna =

Town in Lesbos, Greece

Mithymna (Molyvos) Μήθυμνα (Μόλυβος)
- Municipal unit
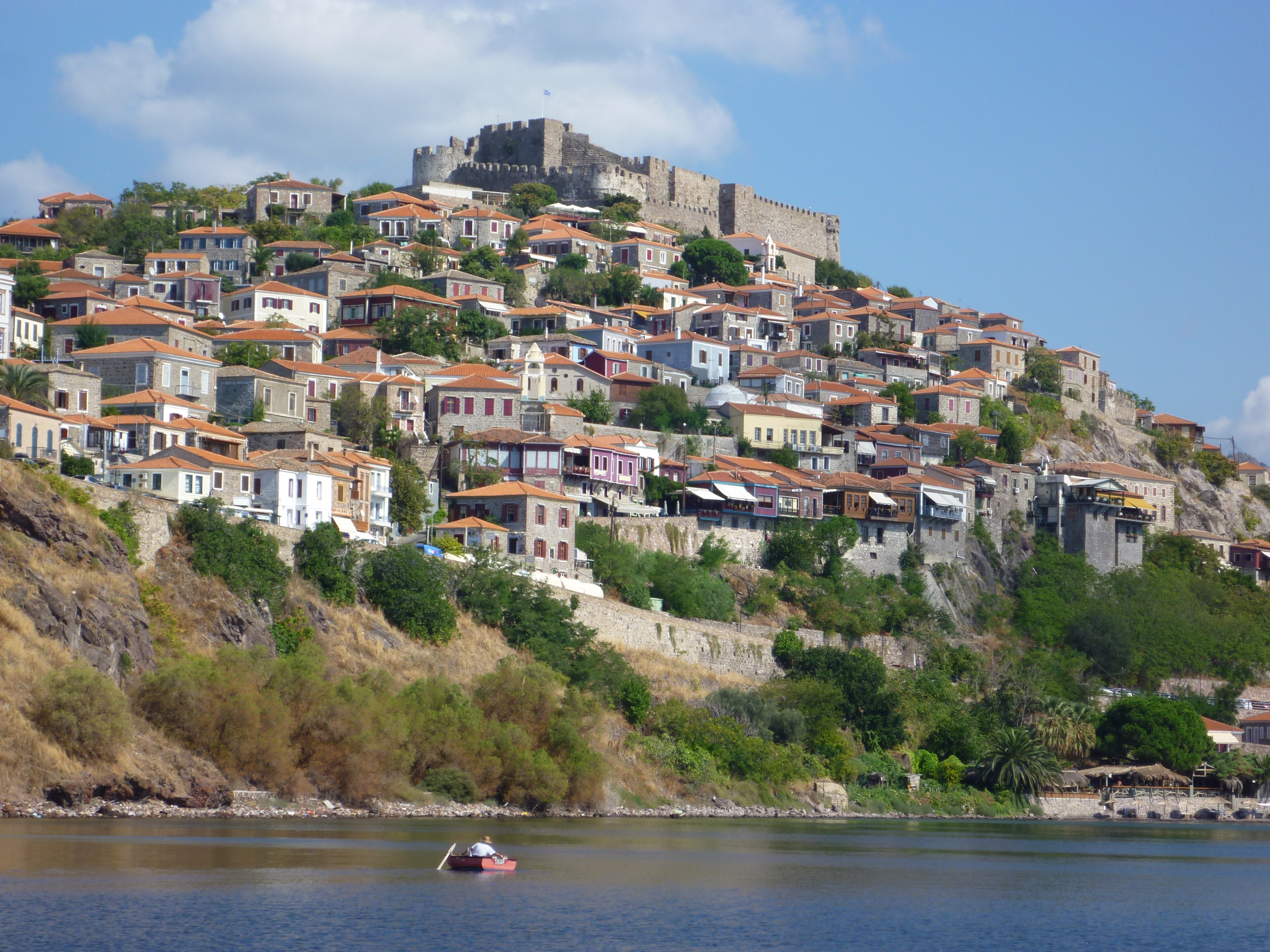

- Location within the regional unit

- Location within Greece
- Coordinates: 39°22′N 26°10′E
- Country: Greece
- Administrative region: North Aegean
- Regional unit: Lesbos
- Municipality: West Lesbos

Area
  - Municipal unit: 50.166 km^{2} (19.369 sq mi)
- Elevation: 51 m (167 ft)

Population (2021)
  - Municipal unit: 1,933
  - Municipal unit density: 38.53/km^{2} (99.80/sq mi)
  - Community: 1,335
- Time zone: UTC+2 (EET)
  - Summer (DST): UTC+3 (EEST)
- Postal code: 811 08
- Area code: 22530
- Vehicle registration: MY
- Website: mithymna.gr

Mithymna (Greek pronunciation: [ˈmiθimna]) (Greek: Μήθυμνα), more commonly known as Molyvos (Μόλυβος), is a town and former municipality on the island of Lesbos, North Aegean, Greece. Since the 2019 local government reform it is part of the municipality of West Lesbos, of which it is a municipal unit. Before 1919, its official name was Molyvos which dates back to the Genoese period, but is still in more common use today than the new official name.

== Geography ==
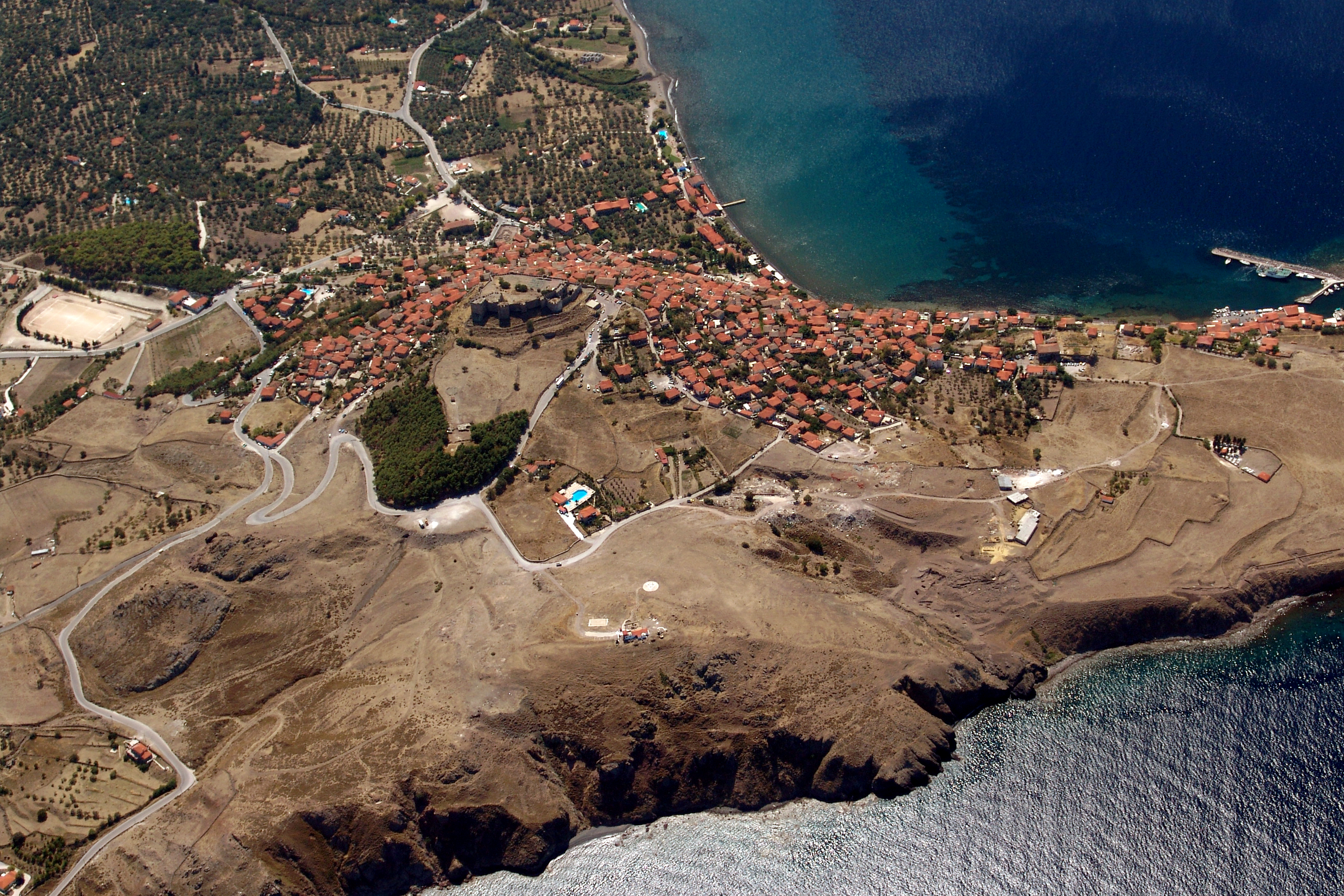
Aerial photo of Mithymna

It is located NE of Eressos, N of Plomari and NW of Mytilene.

The town (pop. 1,399 at 2011 census) is on the northern part of the island, just some 6 km north of the popular beach town of Petra. One of the most noticeable features of the town is the old Genoese fortress on the hill in the middle of the town. The town's agora is located on the uphill road to the fortress and is popular among tourists, with many historic shops, cafés and restaurants.

The municipal unit of Míthymna stretches eastward from the town along the northern part of the island; it is the island's smallest municipal unit in land area at 50.166 km². Its population was 2,255 at the 2011 census. The next largest towns in the municipal unit are Árgennos (pop. 240) and Sykaminéa (207).

Molyvos Beach is one of the Blue Flag beaches in Lesbos. The shoreline is pebbled, but the seabed consists entirely of soft sand and remains shallow for a considerable distance. The agora and fortress are visible from the beach.

== History ==
As Methymna, the city was once the prosperous second city of Lesbos, with a founding myth that identified an eponymous Methymna (Greek: Μήθυμνα), the daughter of Macar and married to the personification of Lesbos. In epic tradition, the hero Achilles besieged Methymna during the time of the Trojan War, and was assisted by the Methymnian princess Pisidice who opened the city gates in exchange for him marrying her. Achilles then sacked Methymna with Pisidice's help, but afterwards he had her stoned by his soldiers for treason.

=== Archaic Period ===
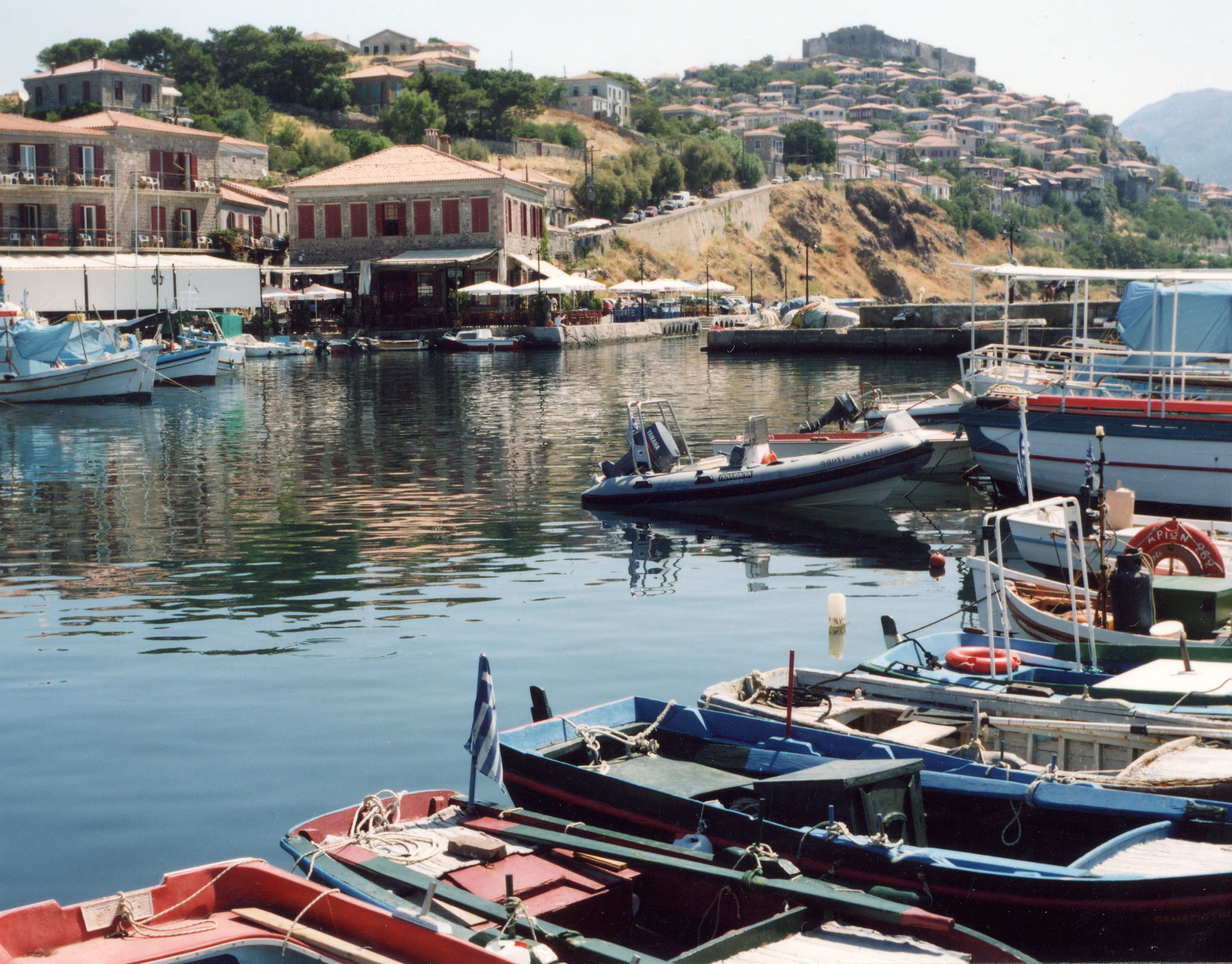
View of the port

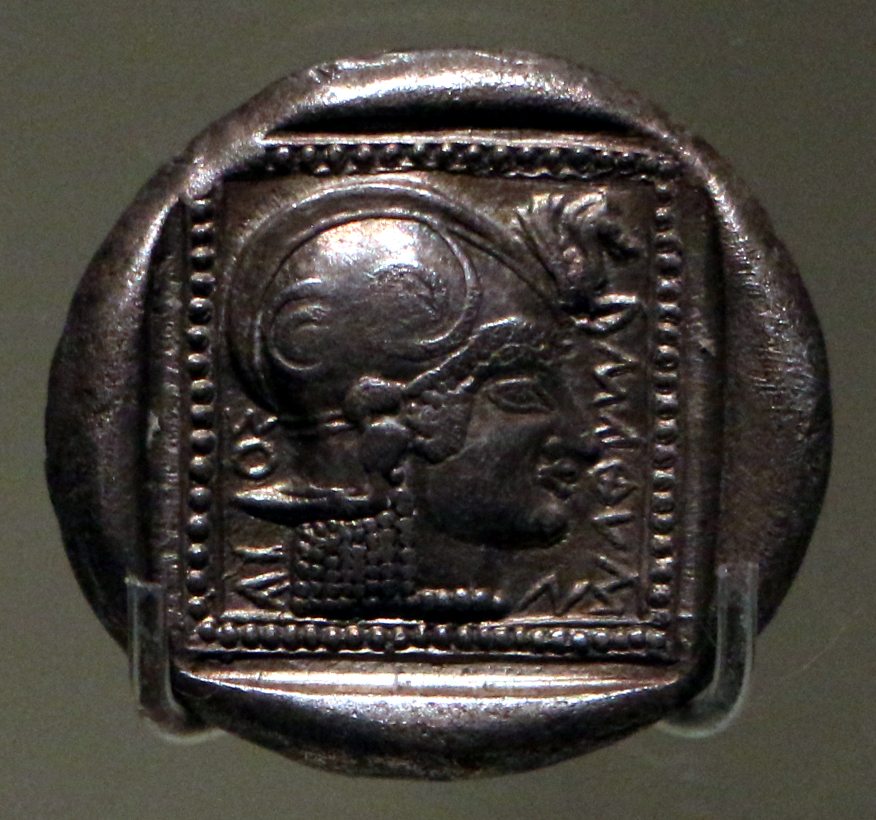
Coin from Methymna (500-480 BC)

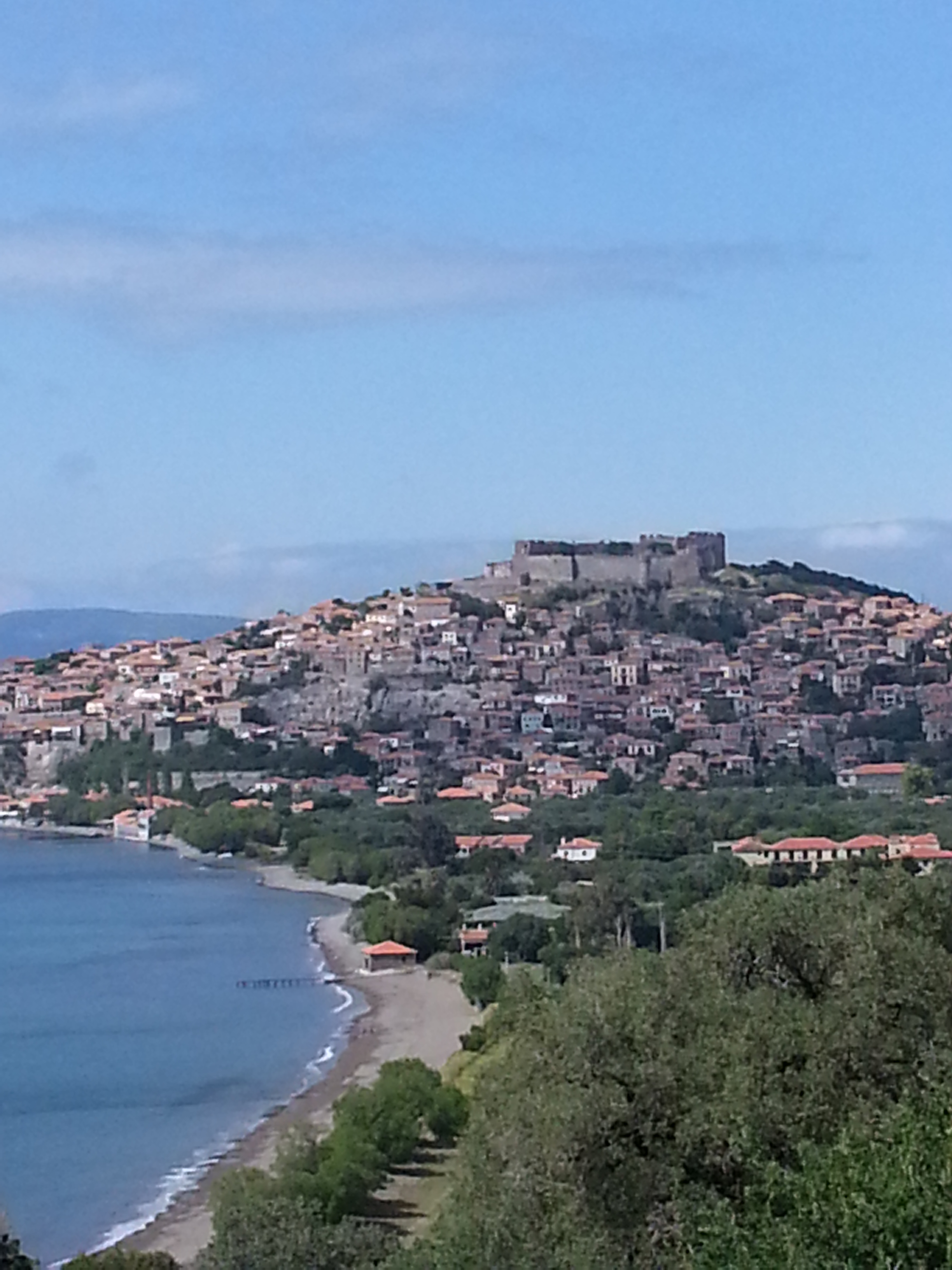
Another view

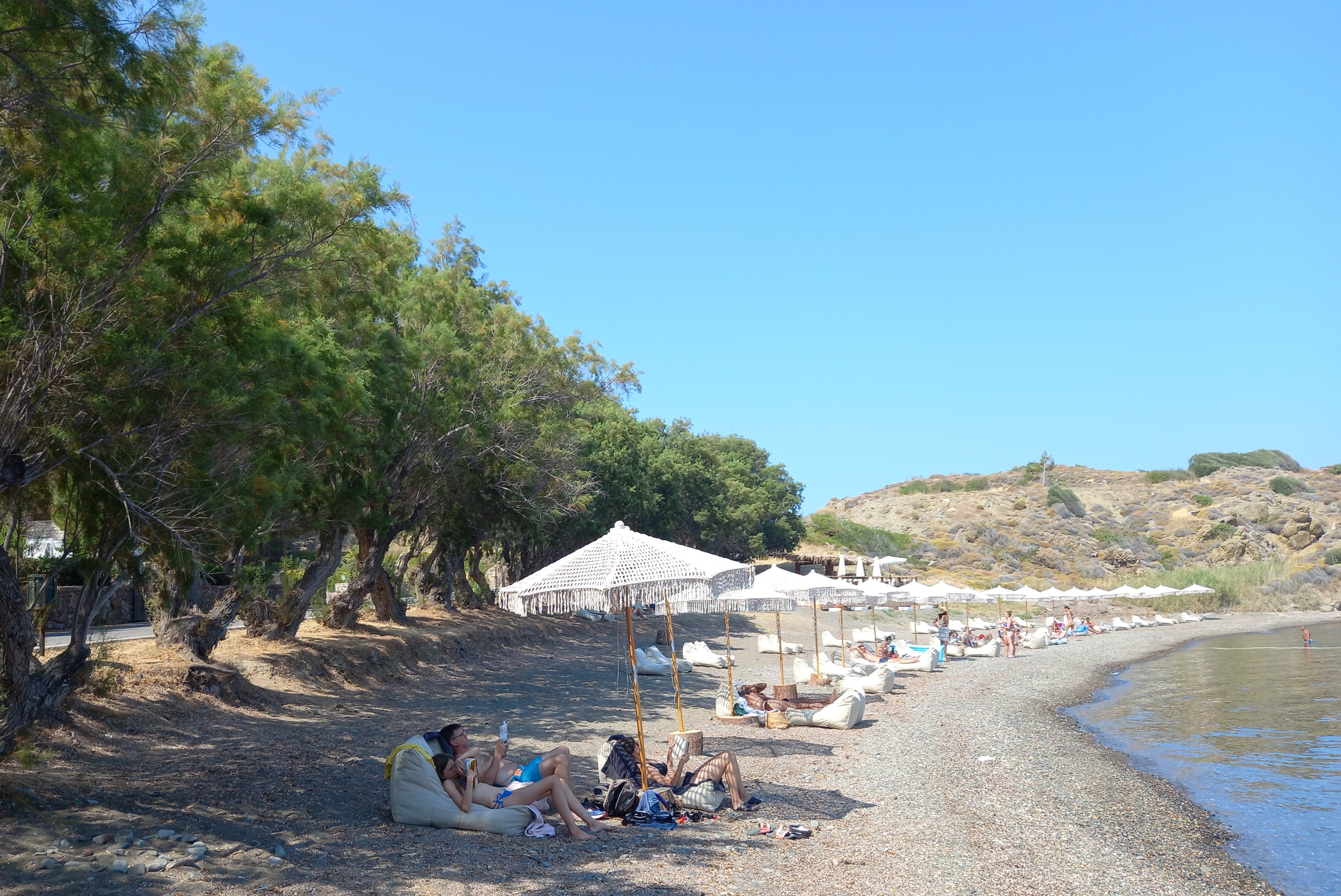
The beach of Eftalou, which is outside of Molyvos

Very little is known about Methymna in the Archaic period. The story of Arion and the dolphin, which involves the Corinthian tyrant Periander and is evidently set at the turn of the 7th century BCE, suggests that Methymna was already a prominent city with far-reaching contacts across the Greek world at this period. Herodotus tells us that at some point in the Archaic period, Methymna enslaved the city of Arisba on Lesbos: this will have greatly increased the territory of Methymna, as well as giving it access to the fertile land around the Gulf of Kalloni. We are also told by a local historian, Myrsilus of Methymna, who wrote in the first half of the 3rd century BCE, that Methymna founded the city of Assos which was on the coast of Asia Minor opposite Methymna. However, another local historian, Hellanicus of Lesbos, writing in the mid-5th century BCE, instead simply says Assos was an Aeolian foundation and does not specify a particular city as its founder. This has led some historians to doubt Myrsilus, and instead suggest that this is an example of "local Methymnaean manipulation of the past", although this could equally be true of Hellanicus.

=== Classical Period ===
Methymna had a long-standing rivalry with Mytilene, and during the Peloponnesian War it sided with Athens during the Mytilenaean revolt in 428 BCE when all the other cities of Lesbos sided with Mytilene. When the Athenians put down the revolt the following year, only Methymna was spared from having its territory turned into a cleruchy. After 427, Methymna and Chios were the only members of the Delian League to remain self-governing and exempt from tribute, indicating the privileged position Methymna held within the Athenian Empire. Methymna was briefly captured by the Spartans in summer 412, before quickly being retaken by the Athenians: in describing this episode, the historian Thucydides indicates that the Methymnaeans were much more inclined to side with Athens than Sparta. This was likewise the case in 411, when a group of Methymnaeans who were in exile at Cyme in Aeolis attempted to return to Methymna by force, but were rebuffed by the population. When the Spartan commander Kallikratidas besieged Methymna in 406, the city stayed loyal to its Athenian garrison and held out until it was betrayed by several traitors.

Our knowledge of the history of Methymna in the 4th century is limited, but its prominence as a polis is firmly attested by the city's silver and bronze coinage. By at least the 340s BCE, the tyrant Kleommis had expelled the city's democrats and remained in power for the next decade. We do not know what happened to Kleommis after this, although it is likely that he was expelled when the island fell to Philip II's generals Parmenion and Attalus in 336. The political history of the following four years are poorly attested: we know that Lesbos changed hands several times between the Macedonian forces of Alexander the Great and the Persian forces of Memnon of Rhodes, that Memnon captured Methymna in 333 BCE, and that when Alexander's admiral Hegelochus recaptured Methymna in 332 BCE its tyrant was Aristonicus not Kleommis. However, it is not clear whether Aristonicus was made tyrant when the Persians recaptured Methymna in 335, or whether Kleommis was re-installed and Aristonicus only made tyrant in 333. Whatever the case, in 332 Alexander gave Aristonicus over to the newly restored Methymnaean democracy to try, and he was found guilty and put to death by torture.

=== Hellenistic Period ===
In c. 295 BCE, Methymna struck silver drachms for King Lysimachus, indicating that the city was part of his kingdom at this time. However, by the 250s BCE at the latest, Methymna had come under the sway of the Ptolemaic Kingdom. During this period, a festival in honour of the Ptolemies, the Ptolemaia, was instituted, and public documents produced by the city were dated by the regnal years of the Ptolemies. Worship of Sarapis, an Egyptian cult patronized by the Ptolemies, was probably introduced to Methymna at this period, and remained an important part of the city's life for several centuries.

In the 2nd century BCE Methymna increasingly pursued a policy of seeking closer ties with the emerging power of Rome. Methymna remained loyal to Rome during the Macedonian Wars, and in 167 BCE it was rewarded when the Romans punished neighbouring Antissa for disloyalty and transferred its territory to Methymna. The territory of Methymna was ravaged by King Prusias II of Bithynia along with several other cities in this region in ca. 156 BCE, but the Romans later compelled Prusias to pay reparations of 100 talents for the damage done. In 129 BCE, an inscription from Methymna shows that the city formed a formal alliance with Rome. A dedication to the Galatian princess Adobogiona (fl. c. 80 - 50 BCE), who was the mistress of Mithridates VI of Pontus, a long-standing enemy of Rome, may indicate a cooling of relations between Methymna or Rome or simply political expediency.

=== Roman Period ===
Methymna gained a particular reputation among Romans for viticulture during the Imperial period. Virgil speaks of the vines of Methymna as the best and most numerous on Lesbos, while Ovid invokes them as an example of something which is proverbially numerous and bountiful. The distinctive strong taste of Methymnaean wine is mentioned by Silius Italicus, and Propertius uses this as a point of reference when describing another Greek wine. When Virgil and Silius wished to indicate the exceptional quality of Falernian wine, Methymnaean wine is among the vintages which they say it surpasses. We also learn from Horace that Methymnaean grapes were equally prized for the excellent vinegar which could be produced from them and which he describes accompanying a sumptuous eel dish. The medical writer Galen, who was a native of nearby Pergamon, considered all the wines of Lesbos to be excellent, but ranked that of Methymna the first in quality, that of Eresos second, and that of Mytilene third. In the novel Daphnis and Chloe, thought to be by the Mytilenaean aristocrat Longus and set in the region of Lesbos between Methymna and Mytilene, the vine harvest is the most important time of the agricultural year, and the Mytilenaean owner of the land in this region times his annual visit to coincide with the end of this harvest when the year's profit can be established.

=== Byzantine Period ===
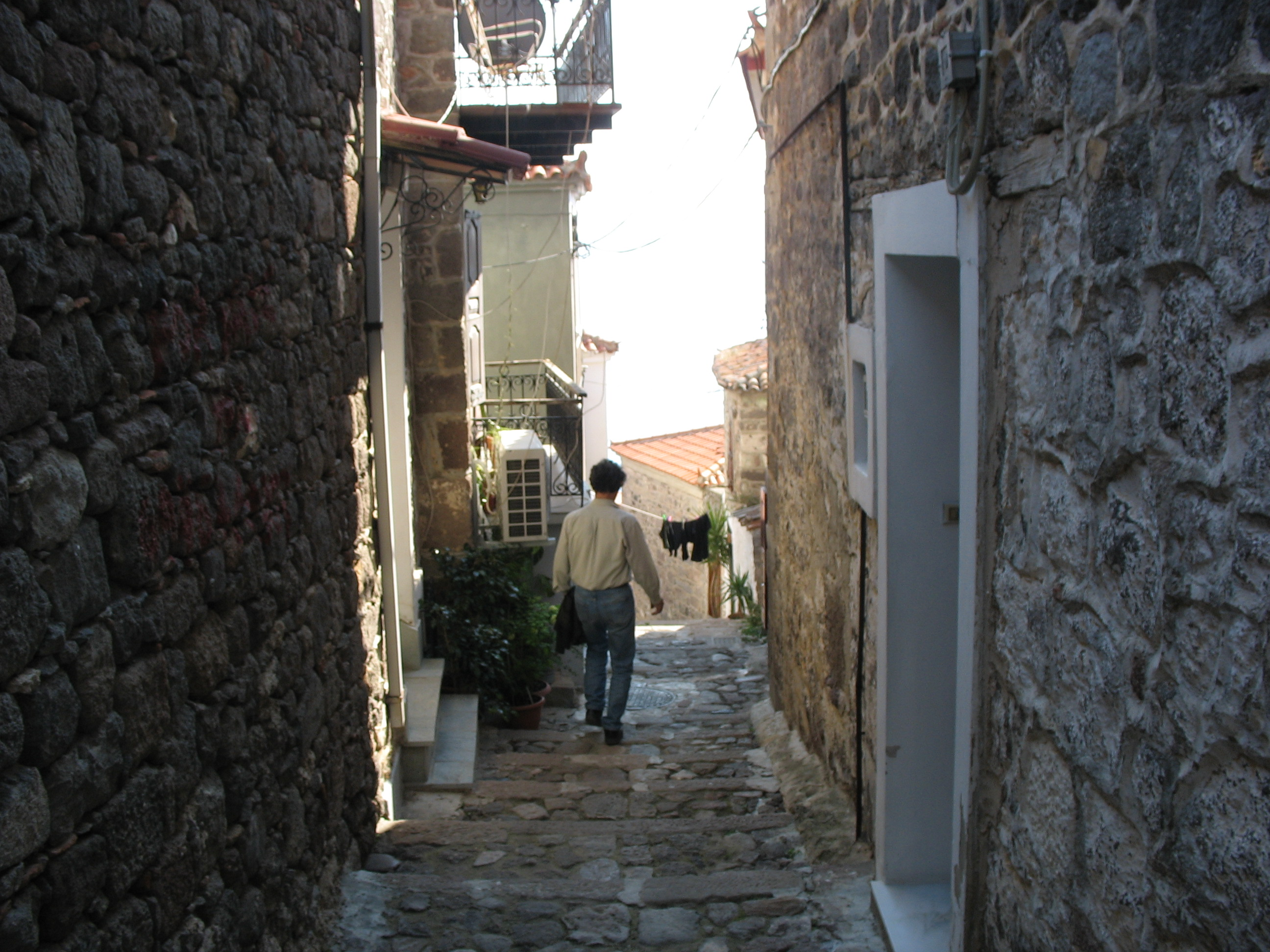
View of a street

The first attested bishop of Methymna was Christodoros in 520 CE. In 640, Methymna was mentioned in the Ecthesis, pseudographically attributed to Epiphanius of Salamis, as an autocephalous archdiocese, and around 1084, it was made a metropolitan see under Alexius I Comnenus. The Fourth Crusade brought Latin control, on the strength of which the Roman Catholic Church maintains a purely titular see of Methymna; there were 40 Roman Catholics in 1908.

In 840 the city was plundered by Cretan Arabs and many of the inhabitants sold into slavery. The fortifications of Methymna were strengthened following this attack, and again at the end of the 11th century, as we learn from a building inscription dating to 1084/5. A few years later in 1089/90 these fortifications helped the inhabitants of Methymna successfully repel an attack by Emir Tzachas of Smyrna. These fortifications again kept Methymna safe when the Genoese Lord of Phokaia, Domenico Cattaneo, seized the rest of Lesbos in 1335, but was unable to take Methymna or the equally well-fortified town of Eresos. Along with the rest of Lesbos, Methymna became a possession of the Gattelusi family of Genoa in 1355 and it was at this time it became known as Molyvos (from 'Mont d'olives'). Molyvos repelled an Ottoman invasion force in 1450, but its defences were over-powered in a second invasion in 1458 when the admiral Ismael seized the city with a force of 150 ships. Using Molyvos as a base, the whole island was gradually brought under Ottoman control by September 1462.

=== Ottoman Period ===
Molyvos is the last castle occupied by the Turks in 1462 after strong resistance. The first centuries of the Ottoman Occupation included confiscations of people’s fortunes, hard taxation and cruelty from the conquerors. This eventually lead to the shift of the chair of the Metropolis of Mithymna to the neighboring Kalloni where it still remains to this day. A great part of the population also chooses to go over to the opposite coast in search of a better life.

As Molova under the Ottoman Empire, the city was a kaza of the sanjak of Metelin in the vilayet of Rhodes.

After the Kucuk-Kainartzi treaty (1774) and the Hatti Sherif (1839) and Hatti Humayun (1856) decrees, the economy gradually went back to the hands of the locals who are now in charge of shipping and transit commerce with Minor Asia's coasts, the Balkan countries, and Russia.

Olive oil, soap, wine, fish and salted fish, and business activities in Minor Asia contributed to the economy of Molyvos, contributing to a rise of mansions, schools and educational institutes in the region during this period. Male and female schools were established, such as 'The Muse Fraternity' with its library, the local Club, the athletic 'Club Arion', etc.

=== Modern Period ===
After the defeat of the Ottomans in the First Balkan War (1912), the Greek navy liberated and incorporated Lesbos in the Greek Kingdom, officially renaming the town back to the ancient name of Mithymna.

== Province ==
The province of Mithymna (Greek: Επαρχία Μήθυμνας) was one of the provinces of the Lesbos Prefecture. Its territory corresponded with that of the current municipal units Mithymna, Agia Paraskevi, Eresos-Antissa, Kalloni and Petra. It was abolished in 2006.

== Historical population ==
Year	Community population	Municipal unit population
1981	1,427	-
1991	1,333	2,359
2001	1,636	2,375
2011	1,570	2,255
2021	1,335	1,933

== Notable people ==
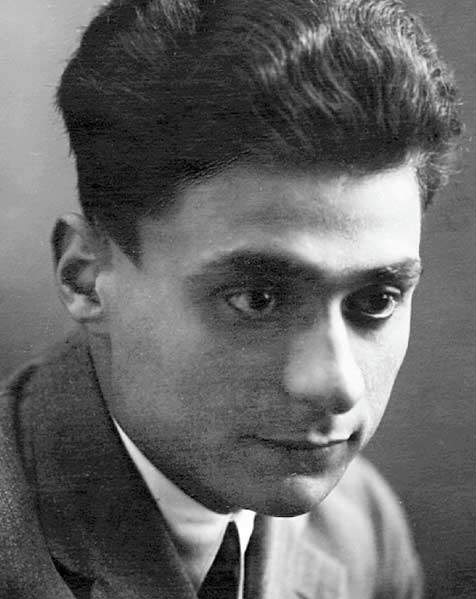
Elias Venezis

- Matriketas, astronomer.
- Echecratides, Peripatetic philosopher and friend of Aristotle.
- Myrsilus, local historian and paradoxographer.
- Hermeias, author of a history of the Sicilian tyrant Dionysus I.
- Theolytus, poet and historian.
- Theoctiste of Lesbos, saint of the Eastern Orthodox Church.
- Elias Venezis, writer

== See also ==
- List of settlements in Lesbos
