= Plug-in electric vehicles in Greece =

As of September 2022, there were 8,790 battery electric vehicles registered in Greece. As of September 2022, 11.8% of new cars registered in Greece were electric.

== Government policy ==
As of July 2020, the Greek government offers subsidies of up to €6,000 for electric vehicle purchases, and €500 for charging station installations.

== Charging stations ==
As of June 2022, there were around 1,700 public charging stations in Greece. As of October 2022, there was one public charging station for every 250 kilometres (160 mi) of road in the country.

== By region ==
=== Attica ===
As of August 2022, there were 62 public charging stations in Athens.

=== North Aegean ===
In October 2022, West Lesbos added an electric car to its municipal fleet, becoming the first municipality in Greece to do so.
