= Eresos =

Village on Greek island of Lesbos

Eresos Ερεσός
- Community
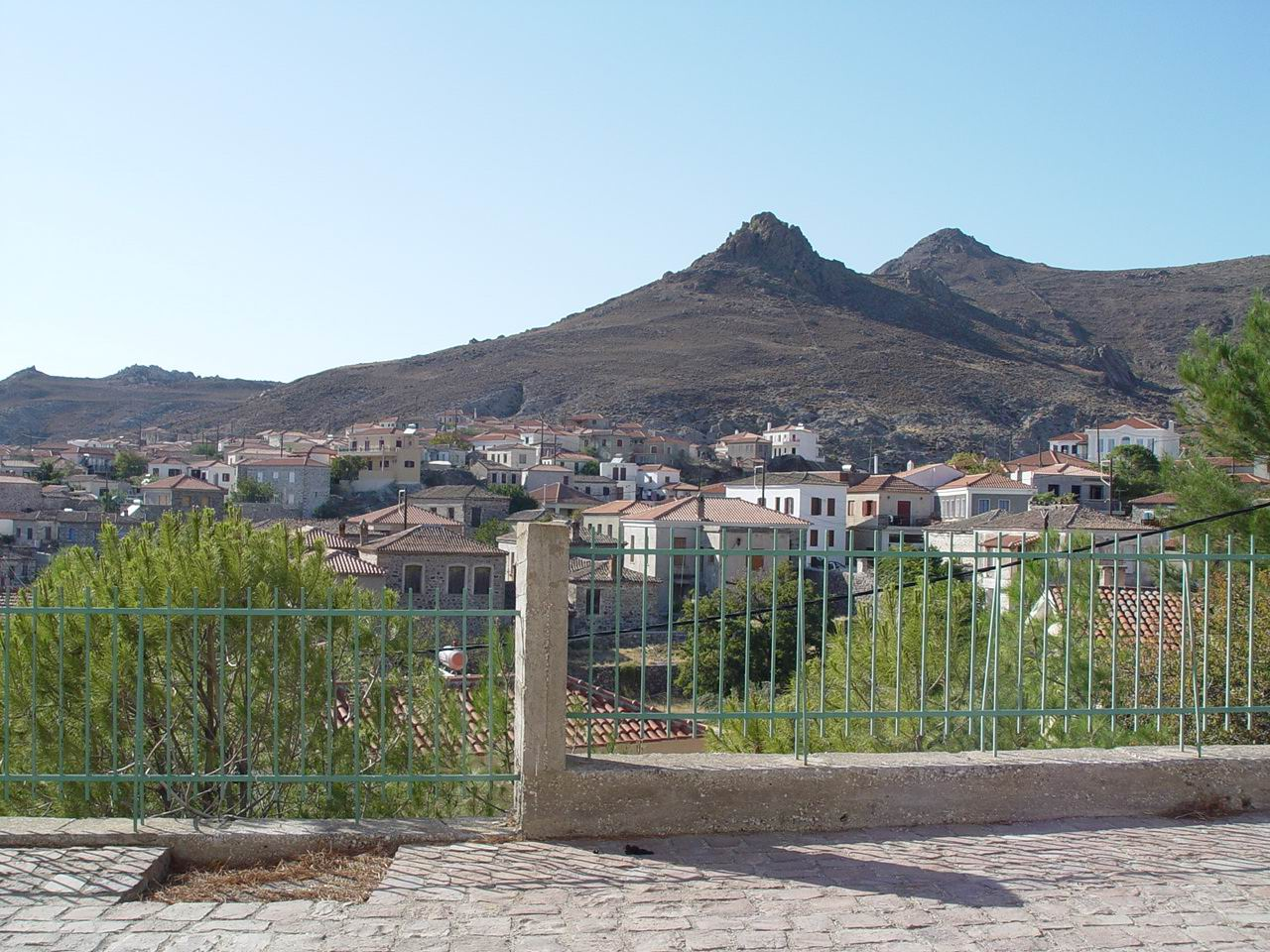

- Location within Greece
- Coordinates: 39°10′16″N 25°55′52″E
- Country: Greece
- Administrative region: North Aegean
- Regional unit: Lesbos
- Municipality: West Lesbos
- Municipal unit: Eresos-Antissa

Population (2021)
  - Community: 1,337
- Time zone: UTC+2 (EET)
  - Summer (DST): UTC+3 (EEST)

Eresos (/ˈɛrəsɒs/; Greek: Ερεσός; Ancient Greek: Ἔρεσος) and its twin beach village Skala Eresou are located in the southwest part of the Greek island of Lesbos. They are villages visited by considerable numbers of tourists. Its history begins in the early Greek Archaic period and famous Greeks of antiquity that were Eressians include Sappho, Theophrastos and Phaenias of Eresus.

== Geography ==
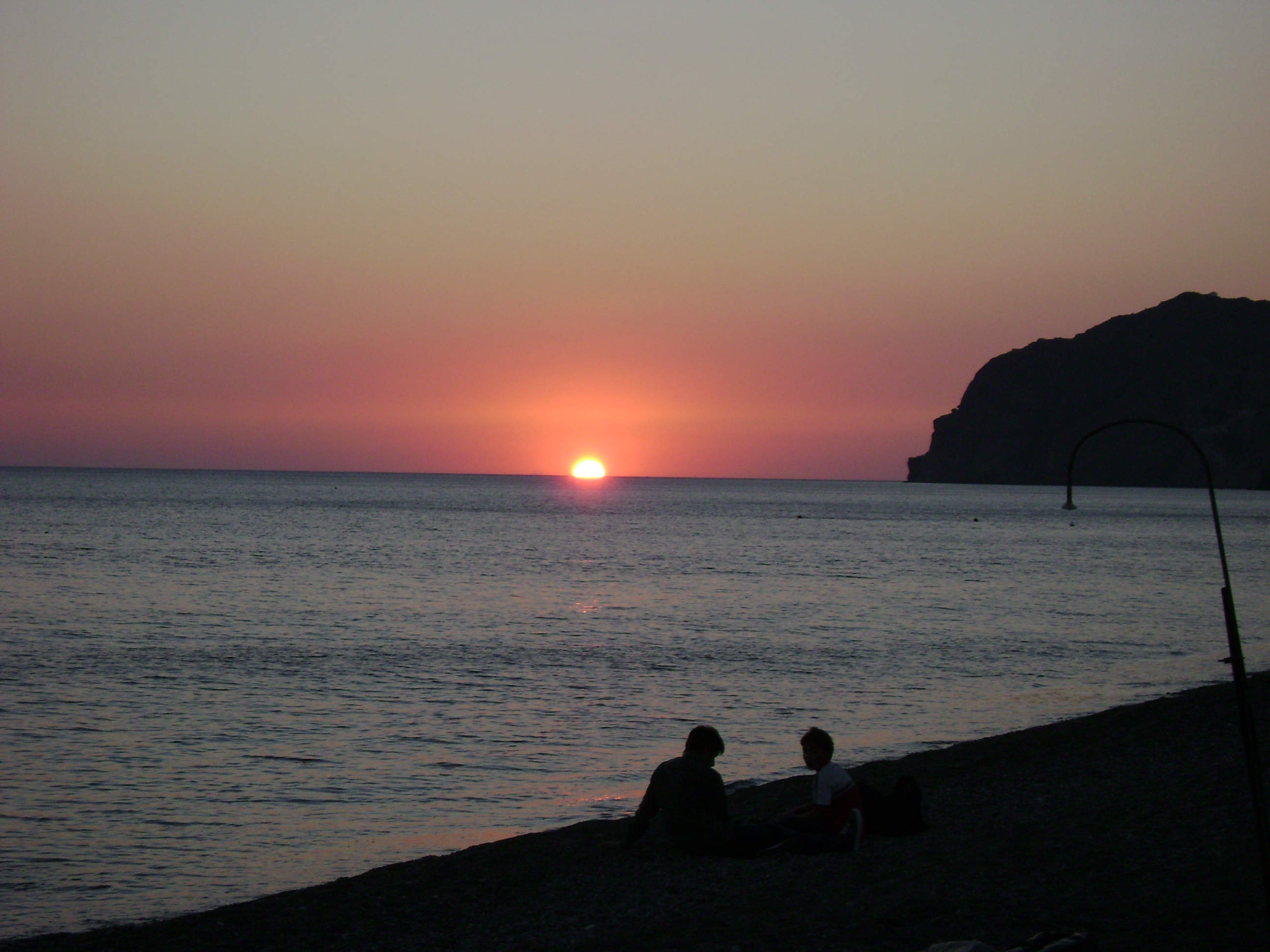
View of the beach at sunset.

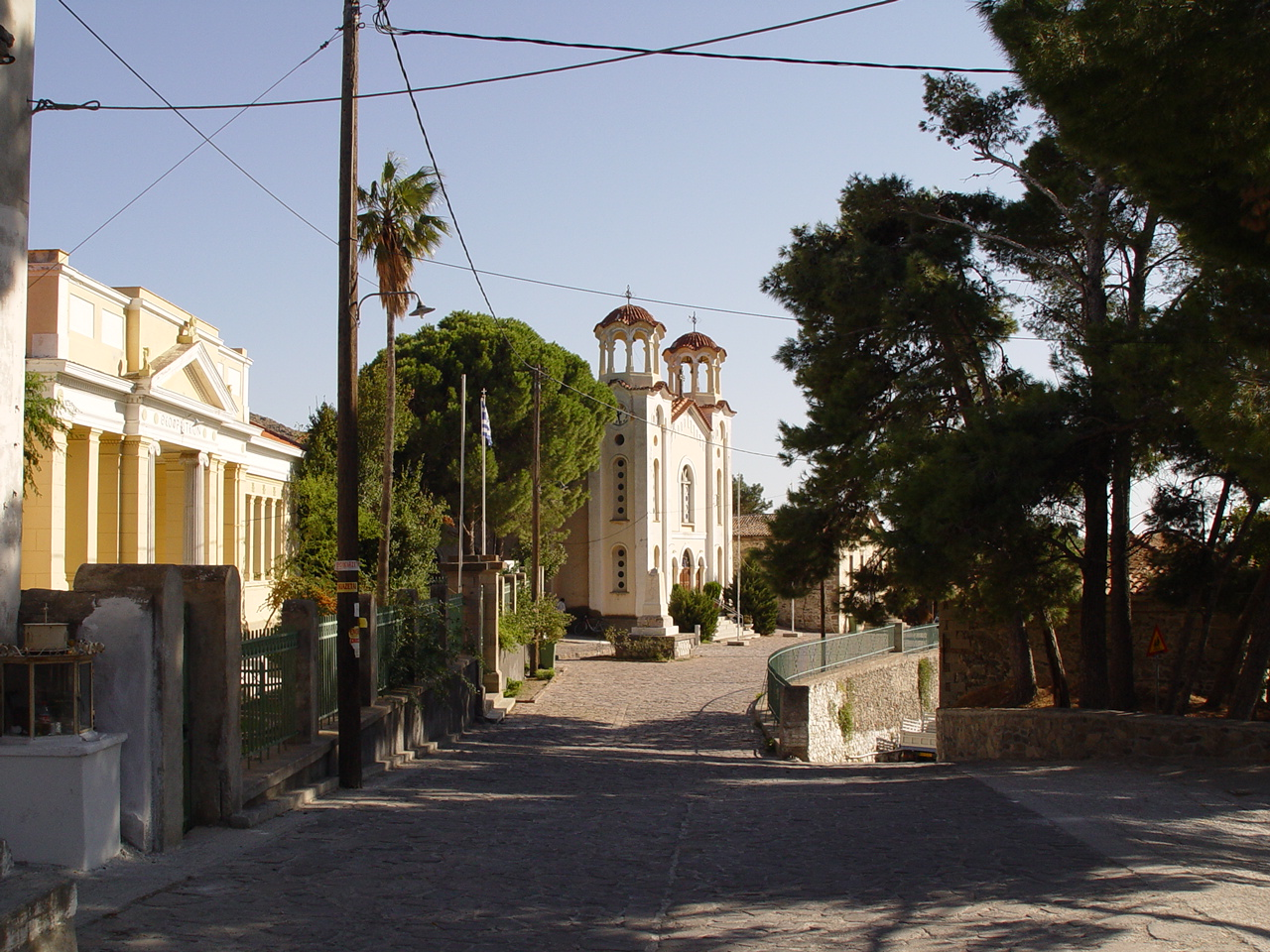
View to Theofrasteion

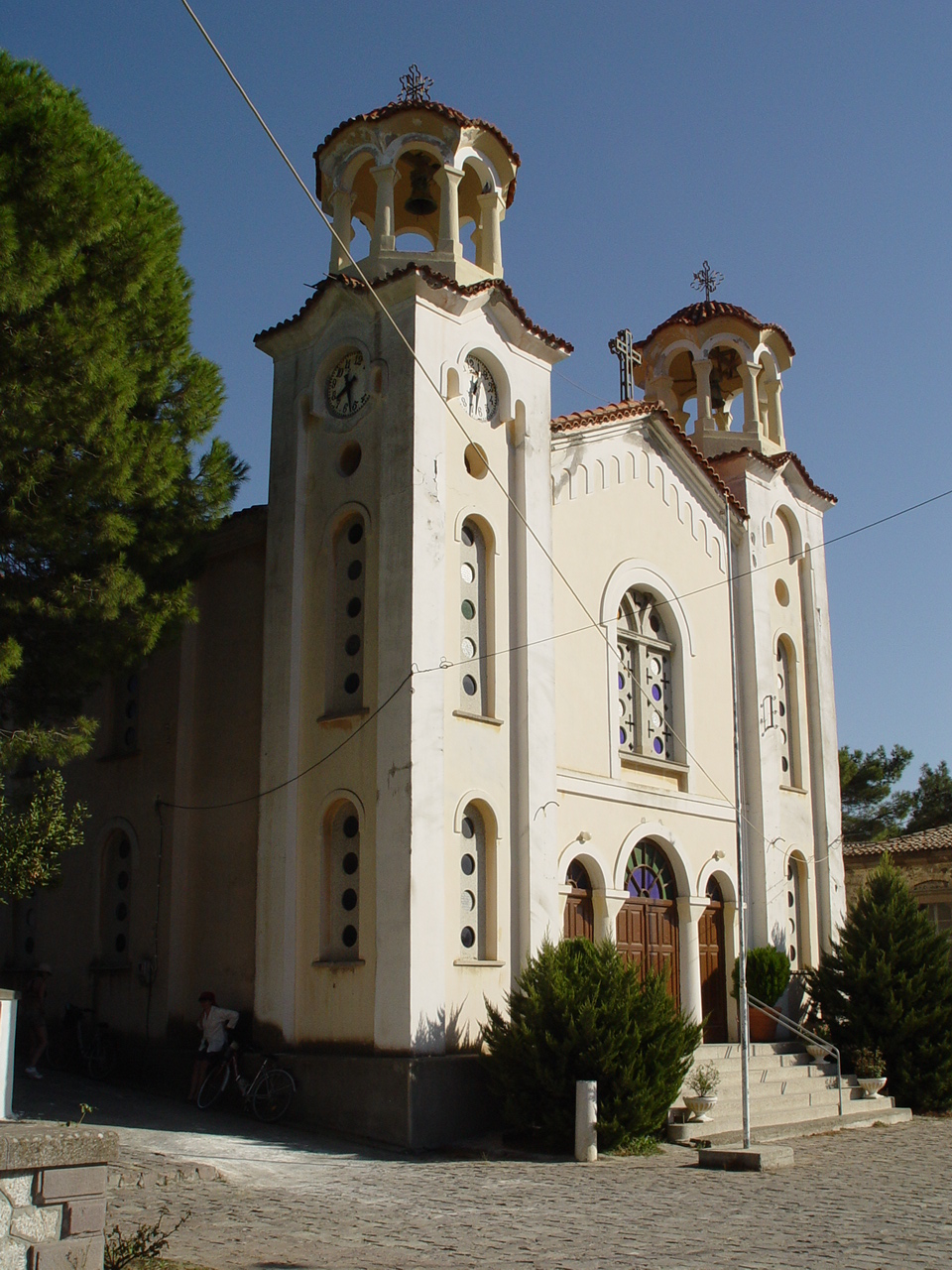
St Irene church

From 1999 until 2010, Eresos and the village of Antissa constituted the municipality of Eresos-Antissa which contained five other villages: Messotopos, Vatoussa, Chidira, Sigri and Pterounda located in the west and most barren part of the island. From 2010 until 2019, Eresos was part of the municipality of Lesvos and from 2019 it is part of the municipality of West Lesvos. Bare rocky hills, derived from ancient volcanic activity, dominate the area. Skala Eresou is a centre for international tourism and is a favorite spot of Greek families, young people as well as gay women. With its long beautiful beach with dark volcanic sand and its crystal-clear unpolluted water, Skala Eressou was awarded Blue Flag status by the Foundation for Environmental Education.

== History ==
=== Archaic period ===
Stephanus of Byzantium, a lexicographer of the 6th century AD, claimed that the city was named after Eresos, a son of the mythical king of Lesbos, Macar. Archaeology suggests that the city of Eresos was founded in the 8th or 7th century BC. Information about Eresos before the Classical period is extremely scant. The lyric poet Sappho may have been born at Eresos c. 620 BCE and belonged to an important family who were socially prominent at Mytilene, the island's most important city. In addition, the oldest Greek inscription on the island, which dates to the 6th century BCE, has been found in the hills above Eresos, and is thought to have belonged to a temple. The remains of defensive towers and large enclosures thought to have had a religious purpose built in the decorative Lesbian polygonal style and located at the edges of Eresian territory suggests a certain degree of wealth and prosperity in the Archaic period.

=== Classical period ===
Eresos, along with Antissa and Pyrrha, was one of the minor cities on Lesbos in the 5th century BCE. When Mytilene revolted from the Delian League in summer 428, Eresos supported Mytilene. The following year, it fell to the Athenian general Paches and, along with the other cities of the island except for Methymna, had an Athenian cleruchy imposed on it. In the latter part of the Peloponnesian War, Eresos went back and forth between Athenian and Spartan control on a number of occasions. In summer 412, Eresos revolted from Athens and joined the Spartan admiral Astyochus in making an unsuccessful attempt to seize Methymna. When Astyochus' attempt to take Lesbos failed, Eresos returned to Athenian control. The following year, exiles from Methymna again raised Eresos in revolt. The Athenian commanders, Thrasyllus at Methymna and Thrasybulus on Samos, both despatched forces to retake Eresos. This siege was called off when the Athenians realised they had been out-flanked by the Spartan admiral Mindarus. Following the Athenian victory at the Battle of Arginusae in 406, Eresos may have fallen under Athenian control as the rest of the island did. Whatever the case, in 405 the Spartan commander Lysander imposed garrisons and Spartan governors on the cities of Lesbos, which remained in place for the next two decades.

Spartan control of Eresos ended in 389 when the Athenian commander Thrasybulus retook the city. In 377 Eresos is recorded as a member of the Second Athenian League. About 371, Theophrastus, remembered as the "father of botany", was born at Eresos; after working with Aristotle on Lesbos and in Macedonia, he eventually followed him to Athens where he succeeded him as head of the Peripatetic school. Phaenias of Eresus was also a native of the town. From 377 down to 332, the chronology of Eresian politics is difficult to establish with any certainty. Athens is thought to have lost control of Eresos following the Social War (357–355 BC), after which its power in the Aegean waned. It was perhaps at this point that the tyranny of Apollodorus and his brothers took power. This family and their descendants remained in power until 336, when Attalus and Parmenion campaigned in the region against the Persians at the behest of Philip II of Macedon. It is assumed that a democracy was set up at Eresos and the city enrolled in the League of Corinth. In 335, Memnon of Rhodes retook this region for the Persian Empire and re-installed the tyranny of Apollodorus and his brothers. In spring 334, Alexander the Great invaded Asia Minor, and it is assumed that the cities of Lesbos (including Eresos) went over to the Macedonian forces soon after his victory at the Battle of the Granicus in May 334; again, the tyrants will have been expelled and the Eresian democrats re-installed. In 333, the admiral Memnon of Rhodes again attacked the island of Lesbos: he seized all the cities except for Mytilene and installed a new pair of tyrants at Eresos, Eurysilaus and Agonippus. A long inscription later set up at Eresos c. 306–301 by the Eresian democrats claims (not without partisan intent) that the tyrants committed many crimes, including expelling the men from the city, holding their women hostage on the acropolis, and exacting large sums of money from the populace, as well as helping the Persians commit piracy against Greek shipping.

In 332, Alexander's admiral Hegelochus of Macedon retook Lesbos from the Persians once and for all and brought Eurysilaus and Agonippus to be tried before Alexander in Egypt, where he left their fate in the hands of the newly restored Eresian democracy. The same long inscription which records the alleged crimes of the tyrants also details their trial which ended in their execution. Biographical traditions of the philosophers Theophrastus and Phaenias of Eresos claims that they were involved in the overthrow of tyranny at Eresos. Efforts were made by the exiled relatives of Apollodorus and his brothers to return to Eresos in 324 and 319 and by the exiled relatives of Agonippus and Eurysilaus to return c. 306–301, but on all three occasions the Eresian democracy was successfully able to argue that they should not be obliged to take back their exiles.

=== Hellenistic period ===
The history of Eresos after the Classical period is only known from its inscriptions, as almost no mention is made of it in the literary sources which survive. In the last two decades of the 4th century BCE Eresos had been subject to Antigonus I Monophthalmus. After Antigonus' defeat at the Battle of Ipsus in 301, the region of north west Asia Minor and the adjacent islands went over to King Lysimachus until his death at the Battle of Corupedium in 281. In the following decades, the cities of Lesbos with the exception of Mytilene drifted into the Ptolemaic sphere of influence. Ptolemaic influence at Eresos in the second half of the 3rd century BCE is indicated by the creation of a religious festival in honour of the Ptolemaic royal family called the Ptolemaia at which gymnastic competitions were held.

Political infighting at the Ptolemaic court following the accession of Ptolemy V Epiphanes in 205 and the campaigns of Antiochus III in the years following led to the disintegration of Ptolemaic influence in the north Aegean. The power vacuum was filled by Rhodes, which soon after agreed a treaty of alliance with Eresos and the other cities of Lesbos. In the first half of the 2nd century BCE, Eresos also drew closer to the other cities of Lesbos under the aegis of the Lesbian koinon, a quasi-federal organisation which had existed on the island in various forms since the early 6th century BCE, but became more active in times when a common danger was perceived. This period of Eresian history also saw closer ties with Rome, at this time an emerging power in the Eastern Mediterranean. Two Romans are honoured in a list of proxenoi from Eresos dating to the last third of the 3rd century BCE, one of the earliest appearances of negotiatores in the Greek East. An inscription recording a letter sent to Eresos by a Roman magistrate and another document honouring the Romans as benefactors of the Greeks, both of which date to the 2nd century BCE, indicate that Eresos, much like the other cities on Lesbos, sought to forge closer ties with Rome. The complete destruction of neighbouring Antissa in 167 will have been a further encouragement to do so.

=== Imperial period ===
It is unclear what role Eresos played in the Mithridatic Wars against Rome (88-63 BCE) and whether, like Mytilene, it subsequently suffered for its anti-Roman stance following victory over Mithridates VI of Pontus. However, by the reign of Augustus the elites of Eresos had become fiercely pro-Roman. There were cults to the Emperor Augustus, his wife Livia, and his heirs Lucius and Gaius Caesar, and the people of Eresos further honoured Gaius Caesar and Claudius Nero, later the Emperor Tiberius, by electing them honorary prytanis in certain years, the most important magistracy at Eresos. Prominent Eresian aristocrats won Roman citizenship for their descendants by participating in the Imperial cult, dedicating altars and temples to the Imperial family, and arranging festivals in their honour. A fragmentary inscription indicates that Eresos successfully petitioned Augustus in 12 BCE on an unknown matter, while in c. 7-4 BCE Publius Quinctilius Varus, the Roman senator and friend of Augustus later defeated at the Battle of the Teutoburg Forest in 9 CE, may have visited Eresos on his way to Syria and conferred Roman citizenship on one of the city's prominent families. In addition, numerous funerary epitaphs and other monuments indicate the existence of a permanently resident Roman population form the 1st century BCE onwards.

=== Modern period ===
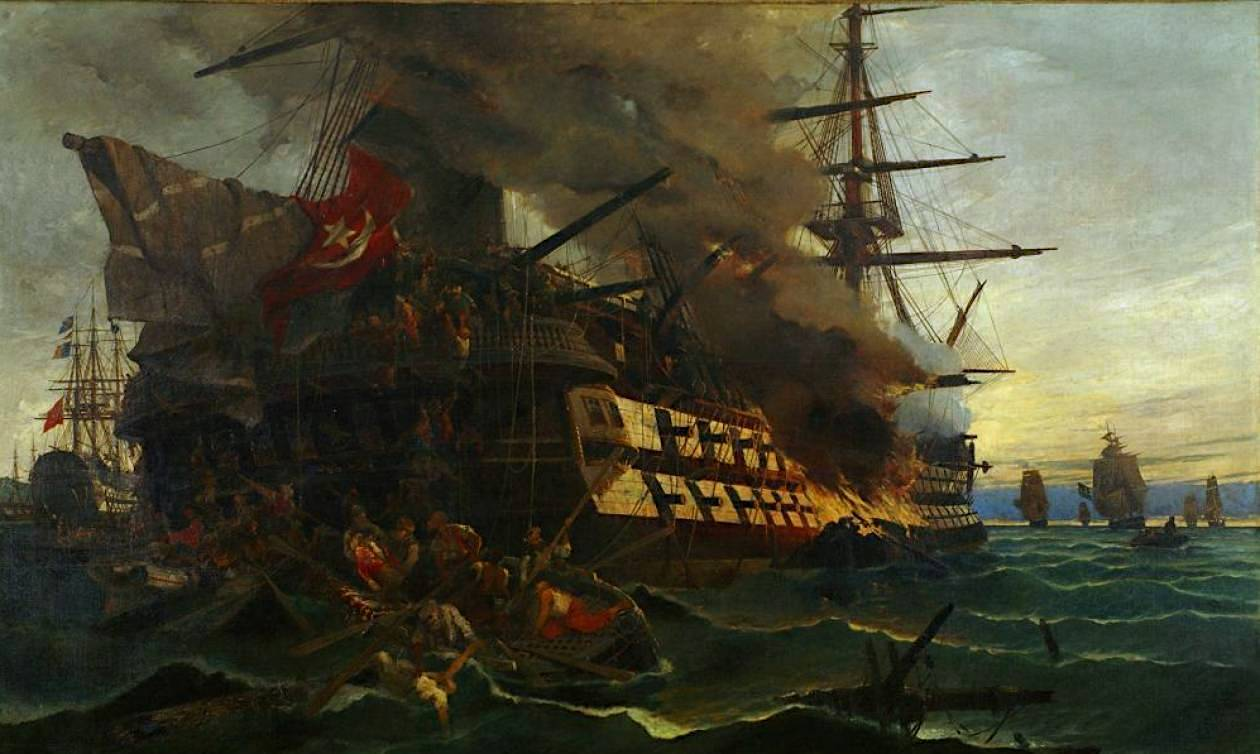
The burning of the Ottoman Two-decker at Eressos, painting by Konstantinos Volanakis

The resettlement of the inhabitants, from the current coastal location of Skala Eressos or Eressos Beach (Paralia Eressos) to the current location of the Eressos Village, which is located about four kilometres from the beach, is estimated at the end of the 17th century and is due to the avoidance of pirate raids. In 1821, at the beginning of Greek Revolution, Dimitrios Papanikolis used a fireship to destroy an Ottoman two-deck frigate which lay in anchor close to Eressos. At the beginning of the 20th century, the doctor Antonios Ar. Koukos, assessing the location of the village as unsuitable from a health point of view and detrimental from an economic point of view, recommended the relocation to the present-day Eressos Beach. To support it, he was the first to relocate. Then others gradually began to settle in Eressos Beach permanently. At the expense of the holy monasteries of Ypsilo and Pythari, the enclosure and repair of the chapel on the Beach was carried out. The priest of the church was maintained by the numerous residents of Eressos Beach with their contribution.

== Demographics ==
Year	Population village
1981	1,494
1991	1,247
2001	1,130
2011	1,086
2021	899

== Sport ==
The only sport club based in Eresos is a football team whose name is AO Papanikolís (Greek: Αθλητικός Όμιλος Παπανικολής), founded in 1979 and currently playing in one of local football championships of Greece, lowest leagues of Greek football. Its name was taken in honor of admiral Dimitrios Papanikolis and its main colors are red and blue.

== In literature ==
Eresos is the setting of Lawrence Durrell's Sappho: a Play in Verse (1950), set in the Archaic period; Durrell invents an episode in which an earthquake causes a large part of the city to be submerged beneath the sea.

Eresos makes a brief appearance in the novel Sure of You, the sixth volume in the series Tales of the City by Armistead Maupin. In the chapter entitled "The Third Whale", Skala Eressou is described as a seaside town with concrete buildings and a beach of coarse grey sand. Some places in the town are described. These include the shop on the square where Mona found the key rings inscribed with the name "Sappho", the hotel called "Sappho the Eressian" where Mona stays in a spare, clean room with a single bed and a lone lamp, the big grey bluff at the end of the beach where more nude bathers were gathered, and the famous tents put up by the women who were part of Sappho's tribe.

== See also ==
- List of settlements in Lesbos
