= Antissa =

Antissa Άντισσα
- Community
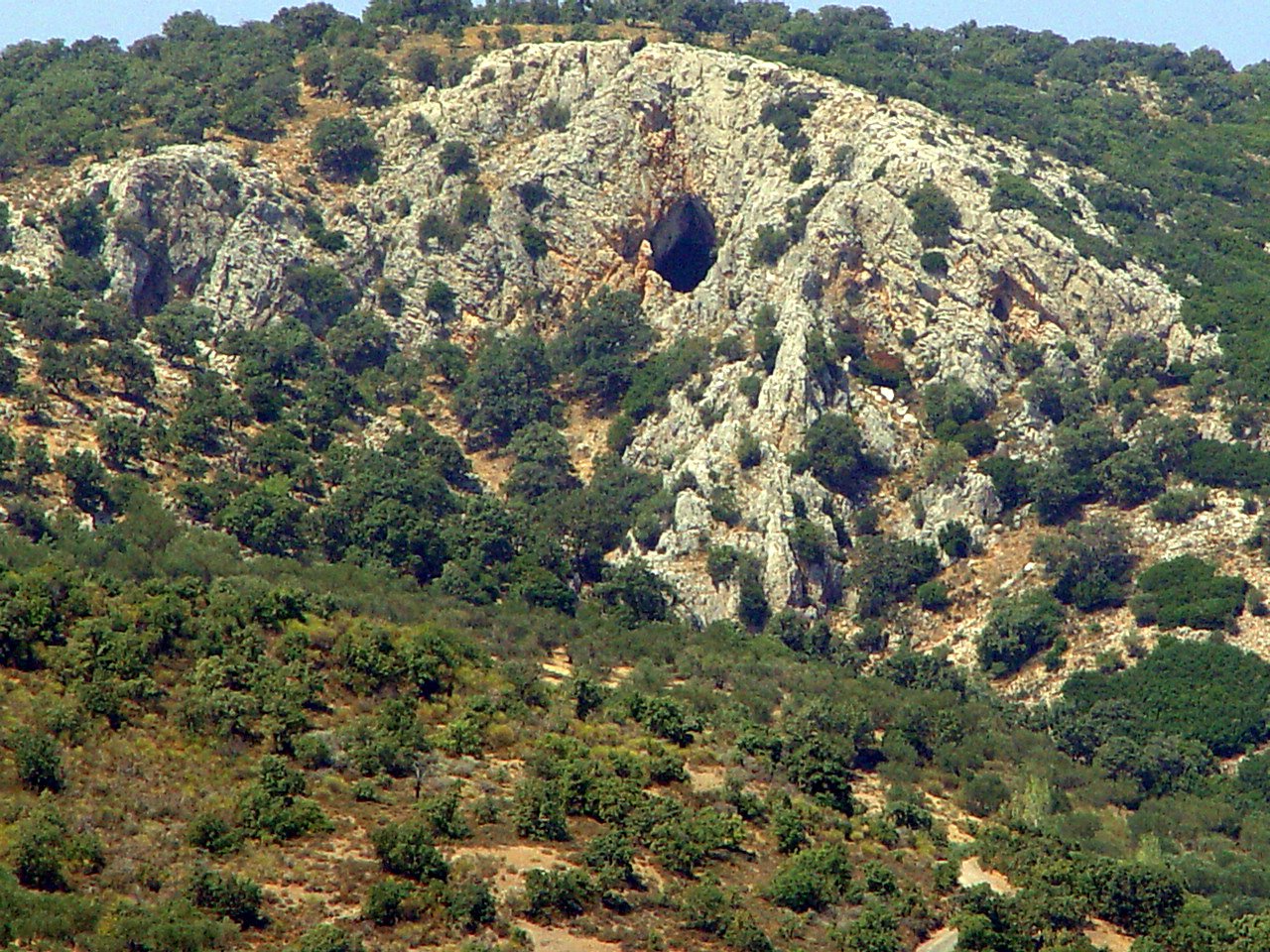
- Orpheus' oracle near Antissa

- Location within Greece
- Coordinates: 39°17′29″N 26°01′08″E
- Country: Greece
- Administrative region: North Aegean
- Regional unit: Lesbos
- Municipality: West Lesbos
- Municipal unit: Eresos-Antissa

Population (2021)
  - Community: 823
- Time zone: UTC+2 (EET)
  - Summer (DST): UTC+3 (EEST)

Antissa (Ancient Greek: Ἄντισσα) was a city of the island Lesbos (Lesvos), near to Cape Sigrium, the western point of Lesbos. The place had a harbour. The ruins found by Richard Pococke at Calas Limneonas, a little NE. of cape Sigri, may be those of Antissa. This place was the birthplace of Terpander, who is said to be the inventor of the seven-stringed lyre. According to the local historian Myrsilus of Methymna, local tradition held that the head of Orpheus had floated south from the Hebros after he was decapitated and floated south to land on the shore of Antissan territory: the spot was marked by a tomb where, according to Myrsilus, the nightingales sang more sweetly than they did elsewhere.

Antissa exists nowadays as a village on Lesbos. Nearby the village is the cave of Orpheus. The village has an alternative old name, it is called "Τελώνια" which may be translated as sprite.

== Foundation ==
Almost nothing is known about the early history of Antissa. The late 1st century AD writer Herennius Philo claimed that Antissa was named after the homonymous daughter of Macar, the legendary king of Lesbos. An anonymous scholiast commenting on Homer alternatively claimed that the Antissa in question was Macar's wife. Since the practice of positing mythical figures to explain the origins of otherwise unexplained toponyms was common - for example, the same is claimed of Methymna, Mt. Lepetymnos, Mytilene, Eresos and Lesbos itself - this tradition about Macar and a female relative named Antissa only indicates that the Greeks themselves did not know the origin of the name.

An alternative tradition attempted to etymologize Ἄντισσα (Antissa) as ἀντ’ Ἴσσα (ant' Issa), exploiting the meaning 'opposite to' of the Greek preposition ἀντί (anti). Re-dividing toponyms to yield explanations for their origin was a common practice, and in this region we encounter it, for example, in the mythological tradition for Antandros in the Troad. This tradition appears to originate with Myrsilus, a local historian from neighbouring Methymna who wrote in the first half of the 3rd century BCE. He wrote that Antissa was formerly an island, so called because it was 'opposite Issa', which at that time, he claims, was the name of Lesbos. This tradition appears to reflect the situation of Antissa's promontory, which was located on a low rise (elevation ~13 metres) jutting out to sea a short distance from its acropolis. The excavator of Antissa, Winnifred Lamb, noted that subsistence was a problem in the low-lying land between the promontory and the acropolis, and so the tradition may relate to an actual change in the landscape; alternatively, it could be the product of learned speculation.

Another interpretation is that the name Antissa comes from the Hittite words "hanti iša", meaning "near the face", in the sense "near the port".

== History ==
Antissa joined the Mytilenaeans in their revolt from Athens in 428 BCE during the Peloponnesian War, and successfully defended itself against the Methymnaeans who attacked it. But after Mytilene had been compelled to surrender to the Athenians, Antissa was recovered by them also. In 371 the Athenian general Iphicrates fled to Antissa, and later to Drys, after he fell out with his father-in-law Cotys, King of the Thracians, when he refused to besiege the strongholds of his fellow Athenians in the Thracian Chersonese. In the 330s BCE Antissa was ruled by a tyranny which also controlled the neighbouring city of Eresos until it was overthrown by the forces of Alexander the Great in 332. Antissa was destroyed by the Romans after the defeat of Perseus, king of Macedonia in 168 BCE because the Antissans had received in their port and given supplies to Antenor, the admiral of Perseus. The people were removed to Methymna.

Archaeological excavations carried out by Winifred Lamb for the British School of Archaeology at Athens revealed parts of the city wall and Iron Age buildings including an apsidal structure. The original island site is now joined to the mainland by a sandy isthmus; its most conspicuous remains are those of a medieval castle. Traces of the harbour mole may also be seen on the eastern side of the city.

== In popular culture ==
Antissa is the name of the first song in the first album by the band E.S. Posthumus, 'Unearthed'. All of the songs in that album are named after historical cities.
