= Chidira =

Chidira Χίδηρα
- Community
- Location within Greece
- Coordinates: 39°12′13″N 26°1′28″E
- Country: Greece
- Administrative region: North Aegean
- Regional unit: Lesbos
- Municipality: West Lesbos
- Municipal unit: Eresos-Antissa

Population (2021)
  - Community: 360
- Time zone: UTC+2 (EET)
  - Summer (DST): UTC+3 (EEST)

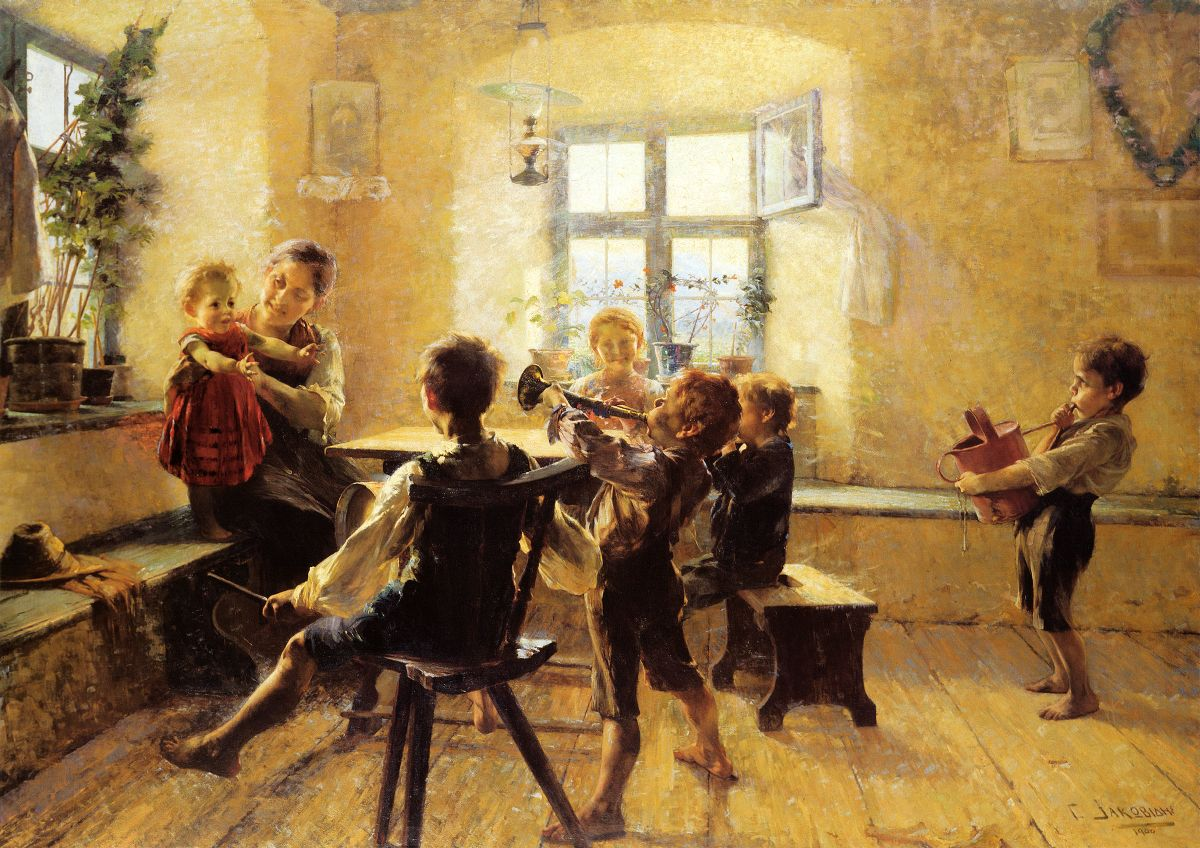
G. Jakobides, The Children's Concert (1894). Oil on canvas, 176 εκ. x 250 εκ. National Gallery of Greece

Chidira (Greek: Χίδηρα) is a village on the Greek island of Lesbos (or Lesvos), located at its western part and belonging to the municipal unit of Eresos-Antissa. Its population was 360 in 2021. Chidira borders with the villages Agra, Mesotopos, Eresos, Antissa, Revma, Pterounda and Vatousa.

Chidira is the birthplace of Georgios Jakobides or Iakovidis, one of the most important Greek painters. The Jacobides Digital Museum is located in Chidira.

== A prehistoric site ==
A prehistoric site is on top of the hill Koirania, right above the village. The site has not been excavated yet, but the dating of artifacts found there, including a stone phallus exhibited at Methymneos Winery (see below), indicate that the site dates back to the 2nd millennium B.C.

== Environment ==
One of the volcanoes which formed Lesvos Petrified Forest is located in the area. The soil is therefore generally acidic and contains many minerals, including sulfur and copper sulfate. Vegetation consists of Mediterranean shrubs, oak-trees and several species of waterplants at the banks of the numerous streams. The area harbors Rhododendron luteum, which favors the acidic soil. Furthermore, the region of Chidira is a wildlife sanctuary and a nature reserve, owing to its abundant fauna and its distinct geological features and flora.

== Wine-making area ==
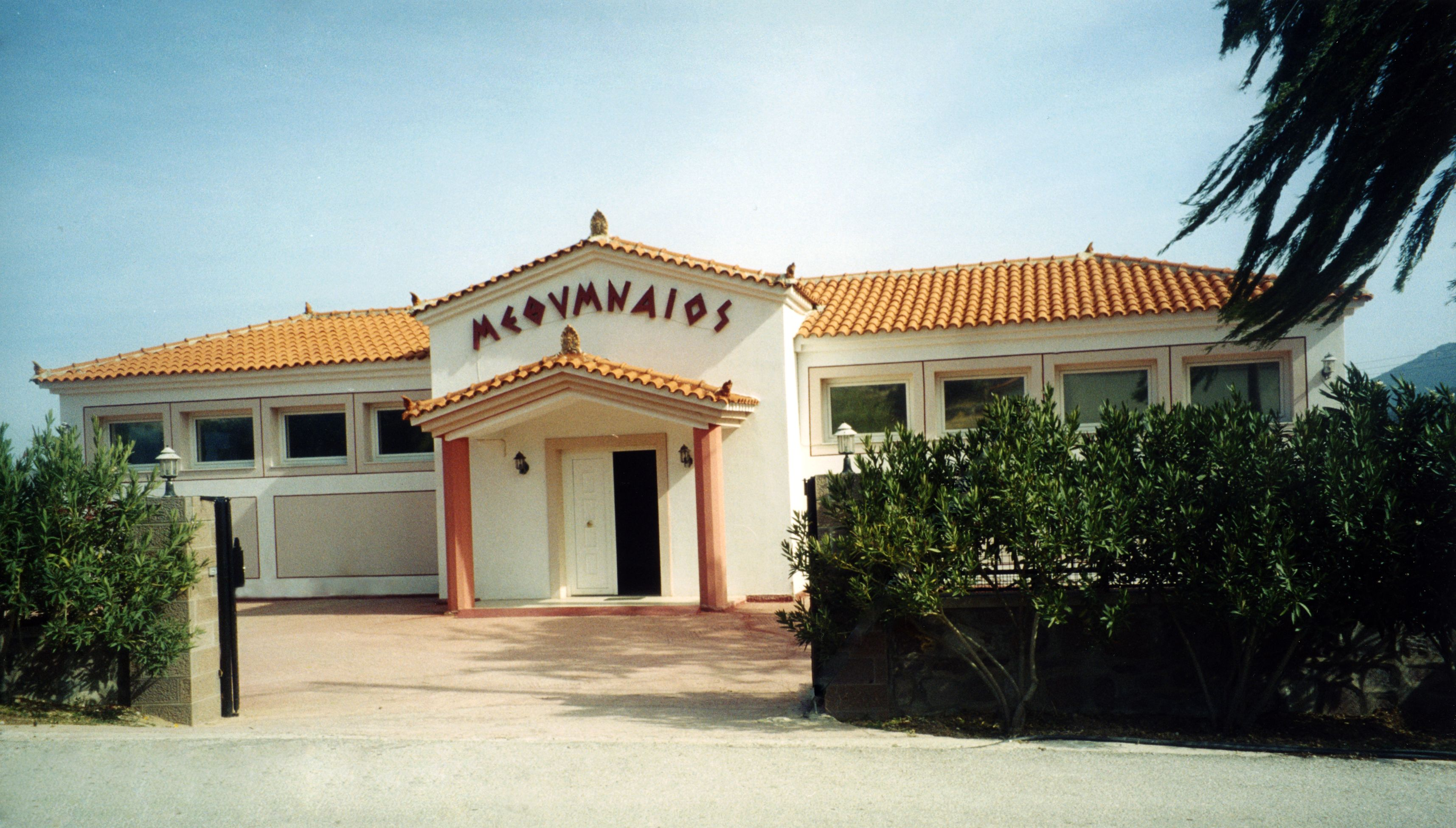
Methymnaeos Winery of Chidira, Lesvos

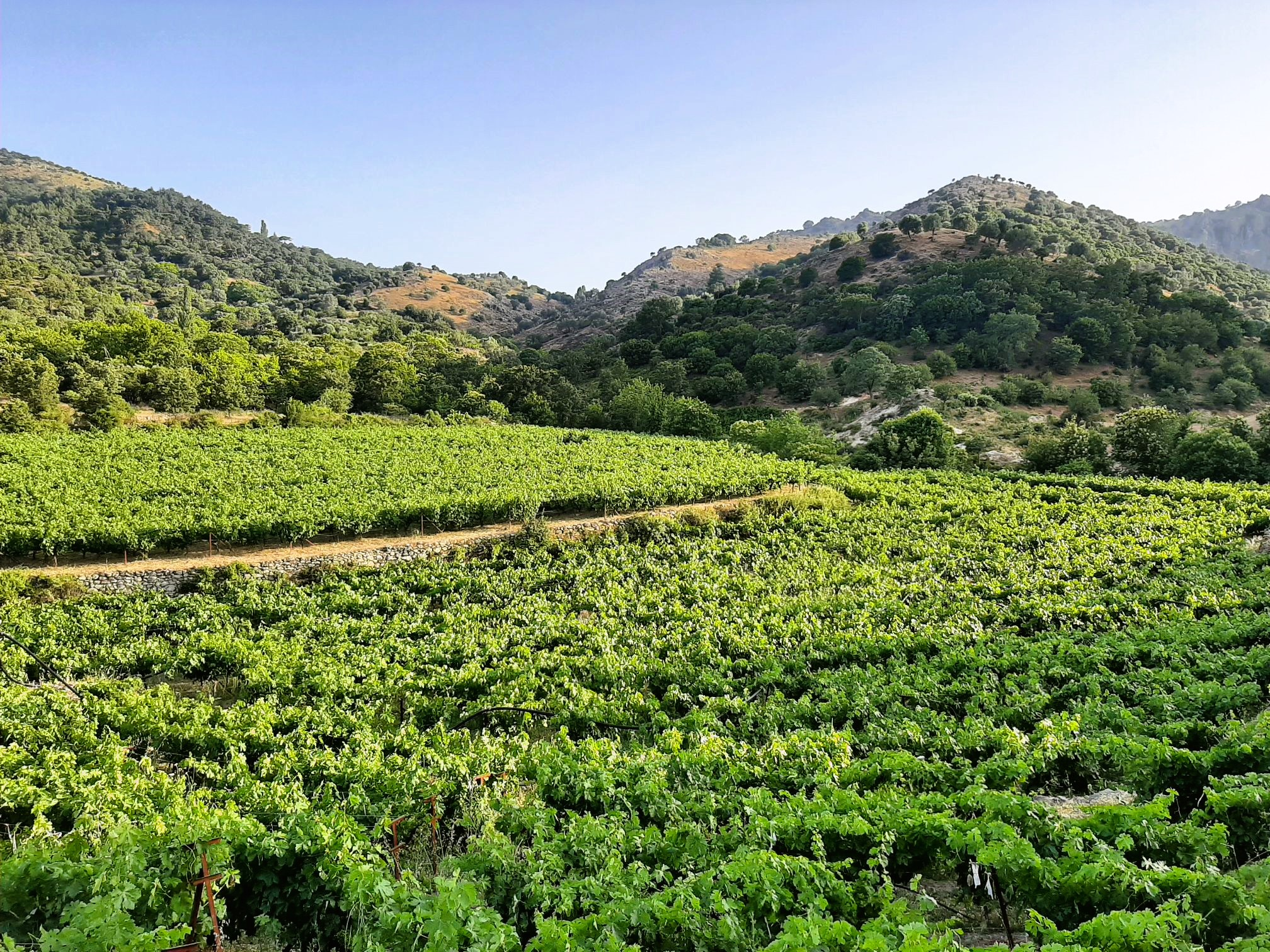
Organic Vineyards - Myrodies Parcel.jpg Methymnaeos Organic Vineyards Myrodies Parcel in Chidira, Lesvos

Methymneos Winery, owned by Yannis Lambrou, is located in Chidira. The winery produces organic wines made exclusively with the Chidiriotiko grape variety of Lesbos. The acidic, sulfuric soil of Chidira gives Methymnaeos wines a strong minerality and prevents vine diseases, thus favoring organic farming. Methymneos is the first commercial bottled wine in the history of the renowned ancient Lesbian wine. Tours to the winery, offered every year in July, August and September by the owner himself, are free of charge.
