= Lesbian wine =

Wine made in Lesbos, Greece

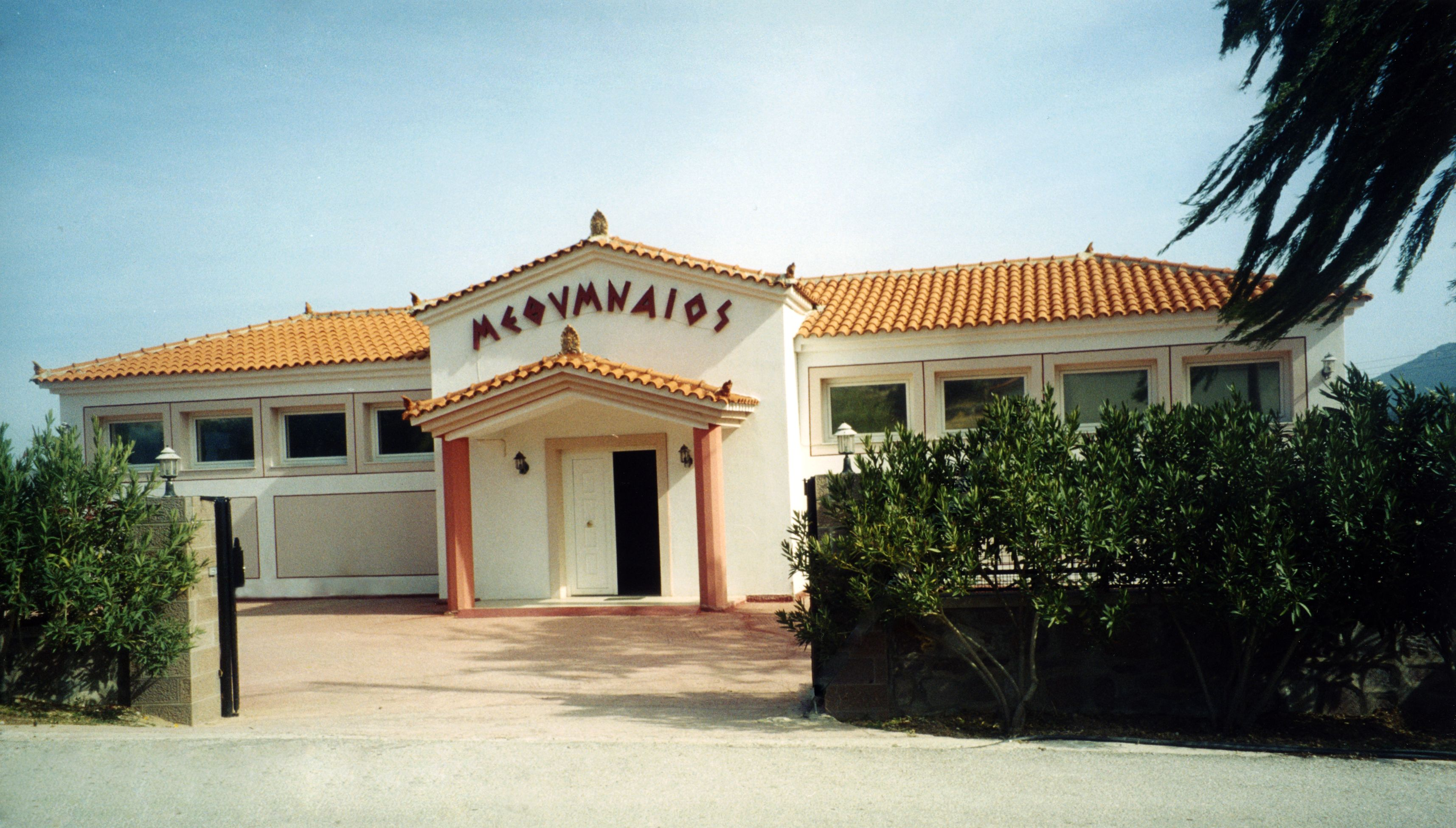
Methymnaeos Winery of Chidira, Lesbos

Lesbian wine is wine made on the Greek island of Lesbos in the Aegean Sea. The island has a long history of winemaking dating back to at least the 7th century BC when it was mentioned in the works of Homer. During this time the area competed with the wines of Chios for the Greek market. An apocryphal account details one of the brothers of the poet Sappho as a merchant trading Lesbian wine with the Greek colony of Naucratis in Egypt. The most noted Lesbian wine was known as Pramnian which draws similarities today to the Hungarian wine Eszencia. The popularity of Lesbian wine continued into Roman times where it was highly valued along with other Aegean wines of Chios, Thasos and Kos.

== Viticulture and wine ==
The warm Mediterranean climate of Lesbos provides a suitable climate for viticulture to flourish. While the exact grapes for the Pramnian are not known, its method of production was recorded. The grapes were allowed to hang on the vine, like that of a late harvest wine, till they were at their ripest points. After harvest, they were piled in large containers to the point that the weight of the clusters crushed the grapes underneath them producing free run juice without the use of a wine press. This juice was said to be very thick and a sort of nectar.

=== Other types of Pramnian ===
While Lesbos is considered by some scholars to be the main source of Pramnian, there is association of the name with wines from Smyrna and Icaria. The Greek writer Athenaeus used the term in almost a generic way to refer to any dark, long lived wine of good quality. Athenaeus's description also paints a different description than of a Tokay-like wine, instead of a wine that is dry and very strong. The resulting grape must is very high in sugar and even after a brief fermentation period it still retains high residual levels and creates a viscous, honeyed sweet wine.

== Modern winemaking ==
In the beginning of the 19th century the spread of phylloxera to Lesbos as well as the island's specialization in ouzo led to the stagnation of Lesbian wine production. After this point in time, wine was only privately produced on the island by farmers, until 1997, when Methymnaeos, the first winery producing bottled wine in the history of Lesbos, began operations in the village of Chidira. Methymnaeos solely produces organic wine made exclusively from the revived Chidiriotiko grape variety of the island. This variety, saved from extinction by phylloxera because of its use by the winery, is cultivated on the sulfuric lava which formed the Petrified Forest of Lesbos. This soil favors organic farming. The resulting organic wine has a rather distinct taste, characteristic of modern Lesbian Wine and attributable both to the unique Chidiriotiko grape variety of the island and to the terroir where it is grown.

== See also ==
- Ancient Greece and wine
