= Skala Eresou =

Village on Lesbos island, Greece

Coordinates: 39°08′N 25°56′E

Skala Eresou (Greek: Σκάλα Ερεσού), also transliterated as Skala Eressou, is a seaside village on the island of Lesbos, Greece, as a part of the community of Eresos.

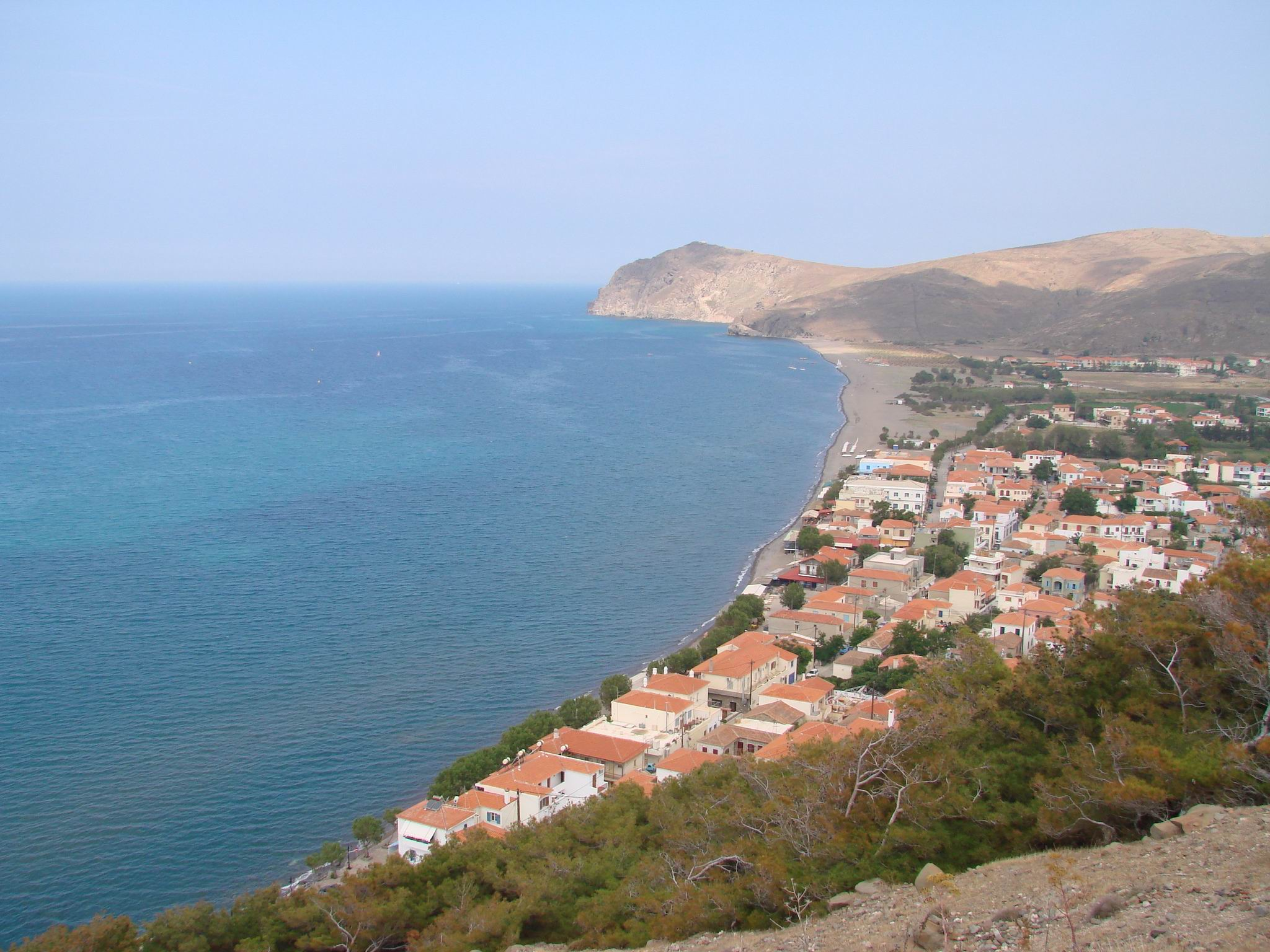
Skala Eresou, aerial view, 2007

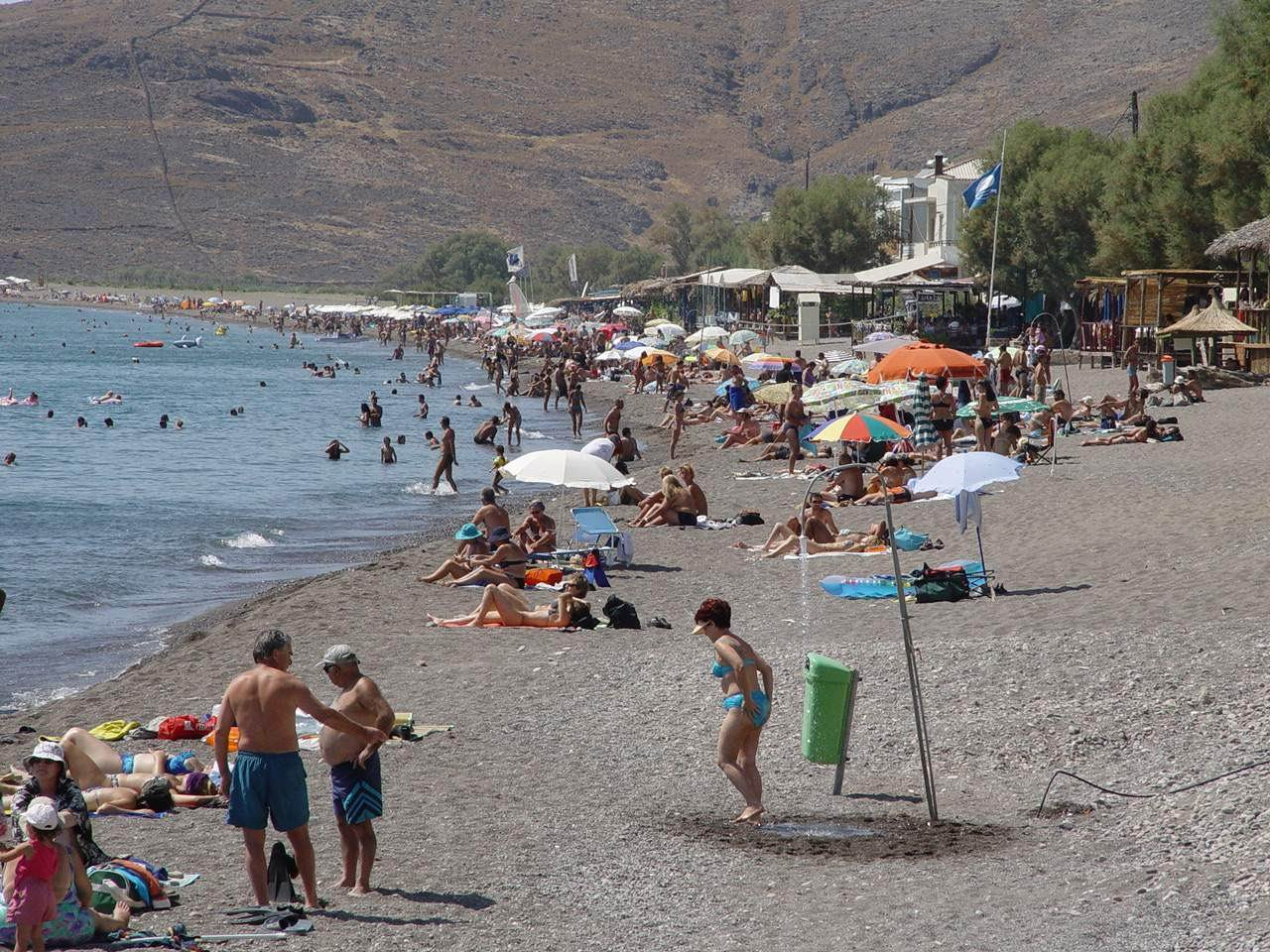
Skala Eresou beach, 2007

Skala Eresou beach

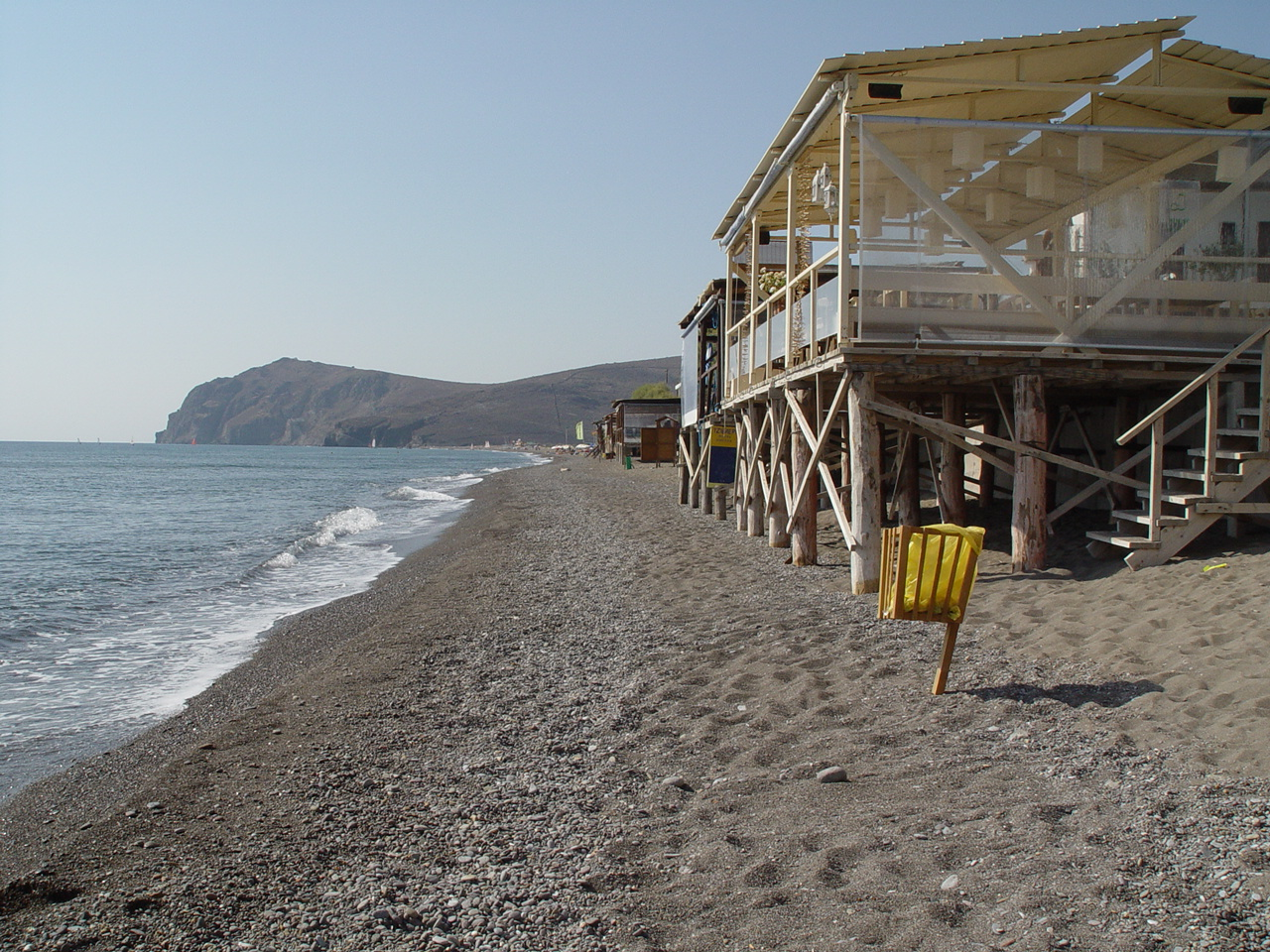
Skala Eresou beach restaurants

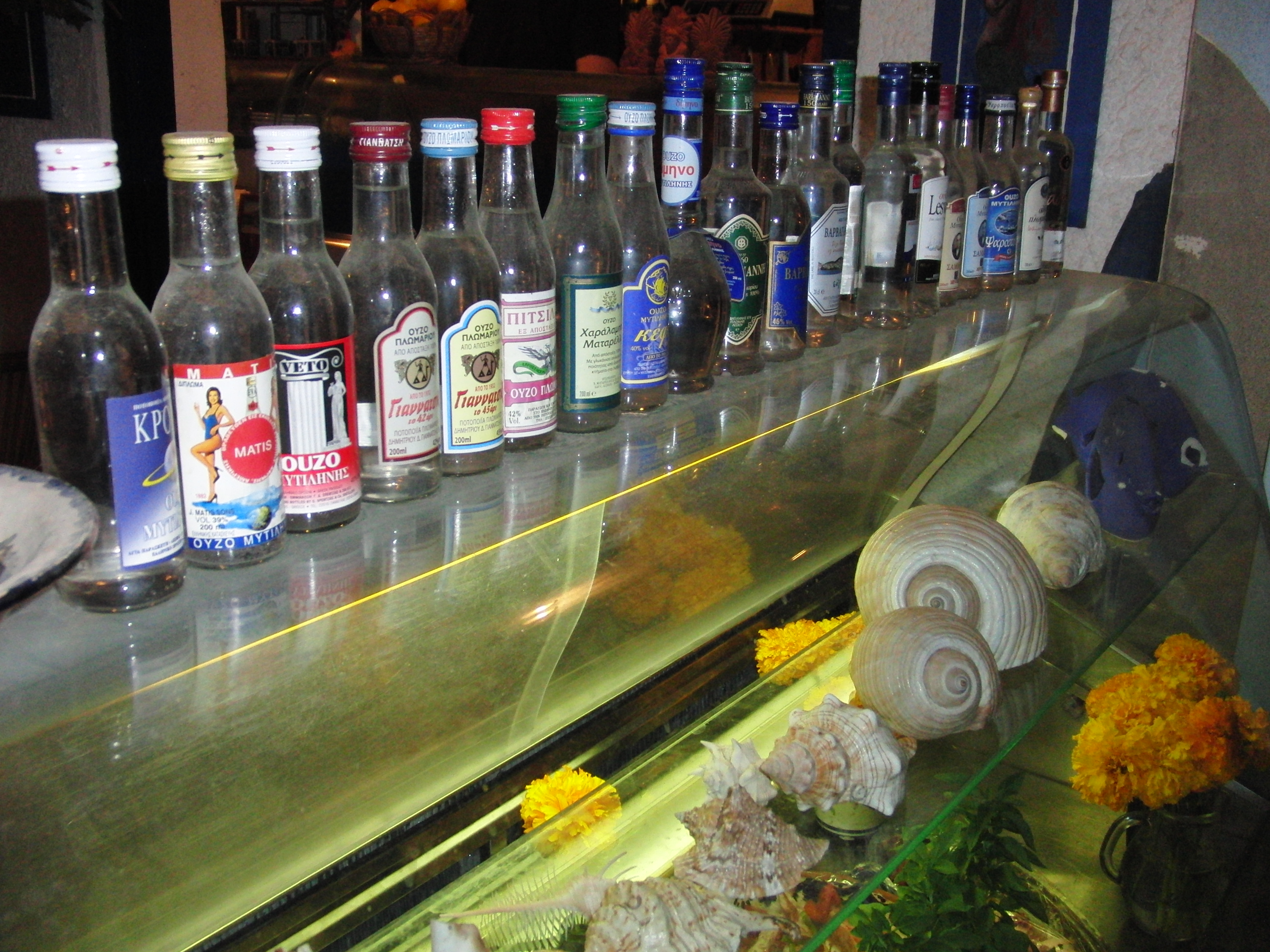
Ouzo bottles in a Skala Eresou taverna

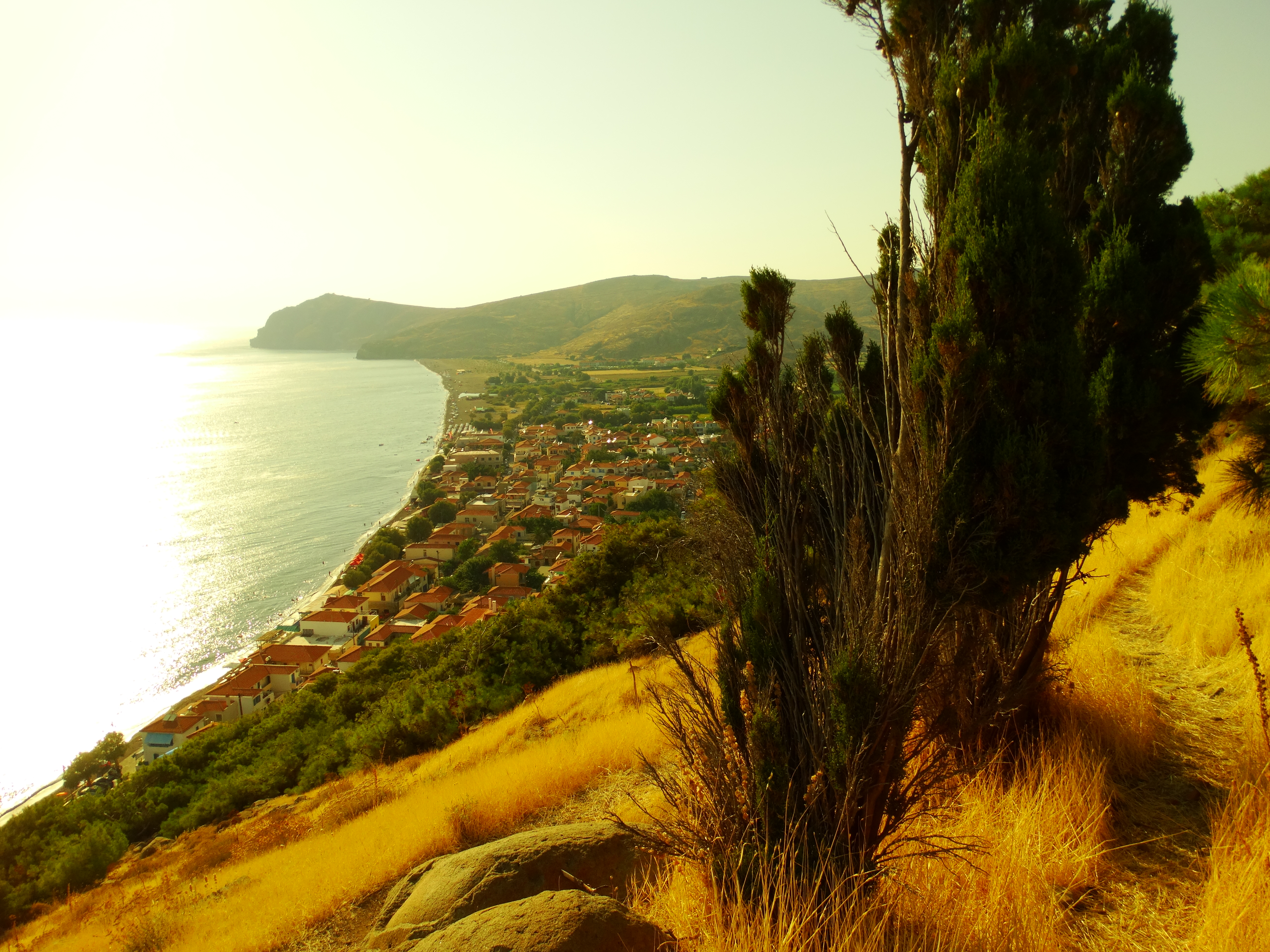
Skala Eresou, hillside view, 2019

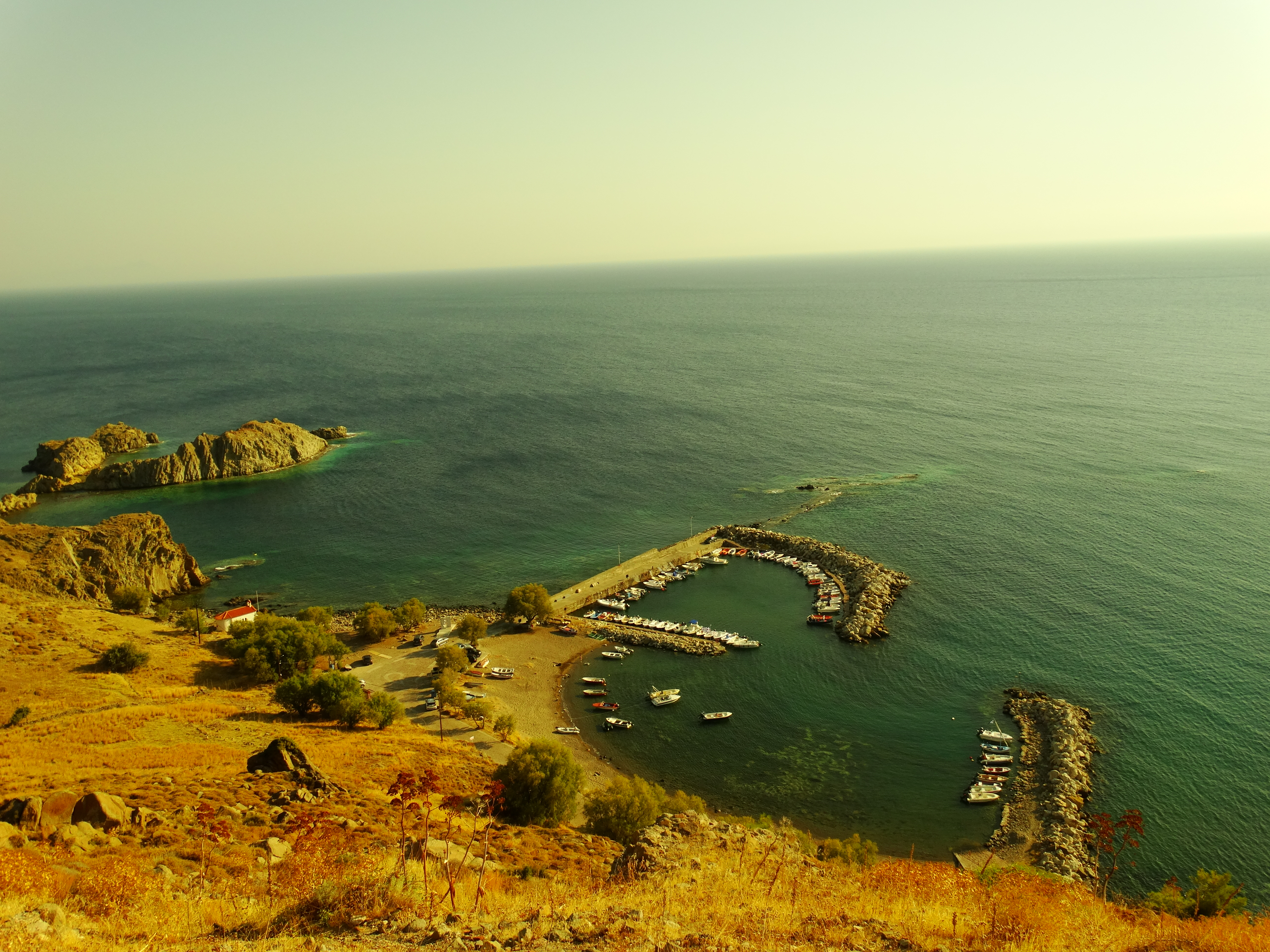
Skala Eresou marina, hillside view, 2019

== Etymology ==
The name "Skala Eresou" has the meaning of "the pier of Eresos" literally. The word "skala" can also have the meaning of "ladder".

== Overview ==
The village has two access roads, one from the north and one from the west. Both lead towards the central square, which is paved with flagstones, but due to the one-way, one-lane system, vehicle access is restricted. There are car parks on the outskirts of Skala Eresou.

The volcanic dark grey beach on the west side of Lesbos extends for almost three kilometers from a small harbour in the east to the headland in the west.

In 2006, the beach of Skala Eresou was awarded the Blue Flag, for the cleanliness of its waters and its beach.

== Tourism ==
Since the 1980s, it has become a popular destination for homosexual female tourists.

In 2000, Candy Bar's, a London lesbian bar, led a group trip for 100 British lesbians to Lesbos, with a Channel Five film crew to make a TV show Lesbians Go Mad on Lesbos narrated by Jackie Clune, with confrontations with locals, now archived, from World of Wonder Productions.

In 2024, the documentary, Lesvia, was released by Tzeli Hadjidimitriou, a lesbian local, about 40 years of lesbian tourism and conflict between visitors and locals, around Skala Eresou.

There are small hotels and self-catering apartments around the village. There is a dispensary, a pharmacy, restaurants and bars. Every summer, Eresos has both Greek and foreign visitors. The village hosts alternative events throughout the summer. A "women festival" takes place in Skala Eresou every September.

Daily buses run in the summer and the village can be reached from the airport or the port of Mytilene.

== Famous people ==
The town is famed for being the birthplace of Sappho, the legendary lyric poet also called the "Tenth Muse." Skala Eresou was also the home for the ancient Greek philosopher Phanias, who was a pupil of Aristotle, and of Theophrastus, the father of classical botany. The ancient city walls are still visible from when it was an important trading centre.
