= Echecratides =

Ancient Greek philosopher, disciple of Aristotle

Echecratides (Ancient Greek: Ἐχεκρατίδης) was an Ancient Greek Peripatetic philosopher who is mentioned among the disciples of Aristotle. He is spoken of only by Stephanus of Byzantium, from whom we learn that he was a native of Methymna in Lesbos.

Several other persons of this name, concerning whom nothing is known beyond what is contained in the passages where they occur, are mentioned by Thucydides (i. Ill), Pausanias (x. 16. § 4), Aelian (V. H. i. 25), Lucian (Timon, 7), and by Anyte in the Greek Anthology (vi. 123.).
