= Aristonicus of Methymnae =

4th-century BC tyrant of Methymnae

Aristonicus (Ancient Greek: Ἀριστόνικος, Aristonikos) was a tyrant of Methymnae in Lesbos in the 4th century BC. In 332, when the navarchs of Alexander the Great had already taken possession of the harbour of Chios, Aristonicus arrived during the night with some privateer ships, and entered it under the belief that it was still in the hands of the Persians. He was taken prisoner and delivered up to the Methymnians, who put him to death in a cruel manner.
