= Petra, Lesbos =

Former municipality on the Greek island of Lesbos

Petra Πέτρα
- Municipal unit
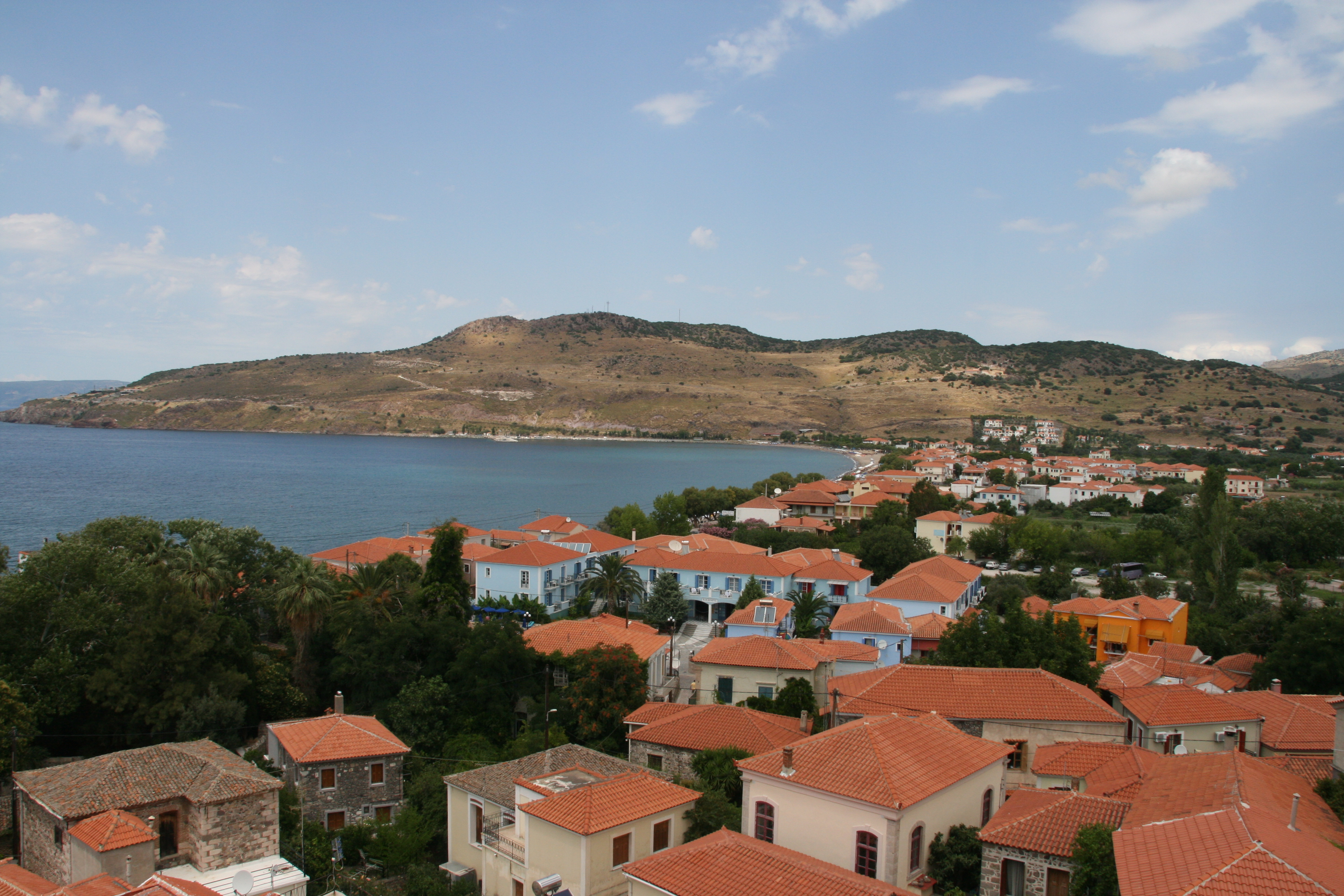

- Location within the regional unit

- Location within Greece
- Coordinates: 39°19′N 26°11′E
- Country: Greece
- Administrative region: North Aegean
- Regional unit: Lesbos
- Municipality: West Lesbos

Area
  - Municipal unit: 72.479 km^{2} (27.984 sq mi)
- Elevation: 13 m (43 ft)

Population (2021)
  - Municipal unit: 3,029
  - Municipal unit density: 41.79/km^{2} (108.2/sq mi)
  - Community: 1,149
- Time zone: UTC+2 (EET)
  - Summer (DST): UTC+3 (EEST)
- Postal code: 811 09
- Area code: 22530
- Vehicle registration: MY

Petra (Greek: Πέτρα, meaning 'rock') is a former municipality on the island of Lesbos, North Aegean, Greece. Since the 2019 local government reform, it is a municipal unit of the municipality of West Lesbos.

Petra is in northwestern Lesbos and comprises the villages Petra, Skoutaros, Stypsi, Lafionas, and Ypsilometopo, and the settlements Petri and Anaxos. The municipality has a land area of 72.479 square kilometres (27.984 sq mi), and a population of 3,029 at the 2021 census. Its largest towns are Pétra (the municipal seat), Stýpsi, and Skoutáros. The town of Mithymna is approximately 6 kilometres (3.7 mi) north of Petra.

The region has olive groves, and also low forests primarily of pine, but also coppice oaks, cypress, and fruit-bearing trees.

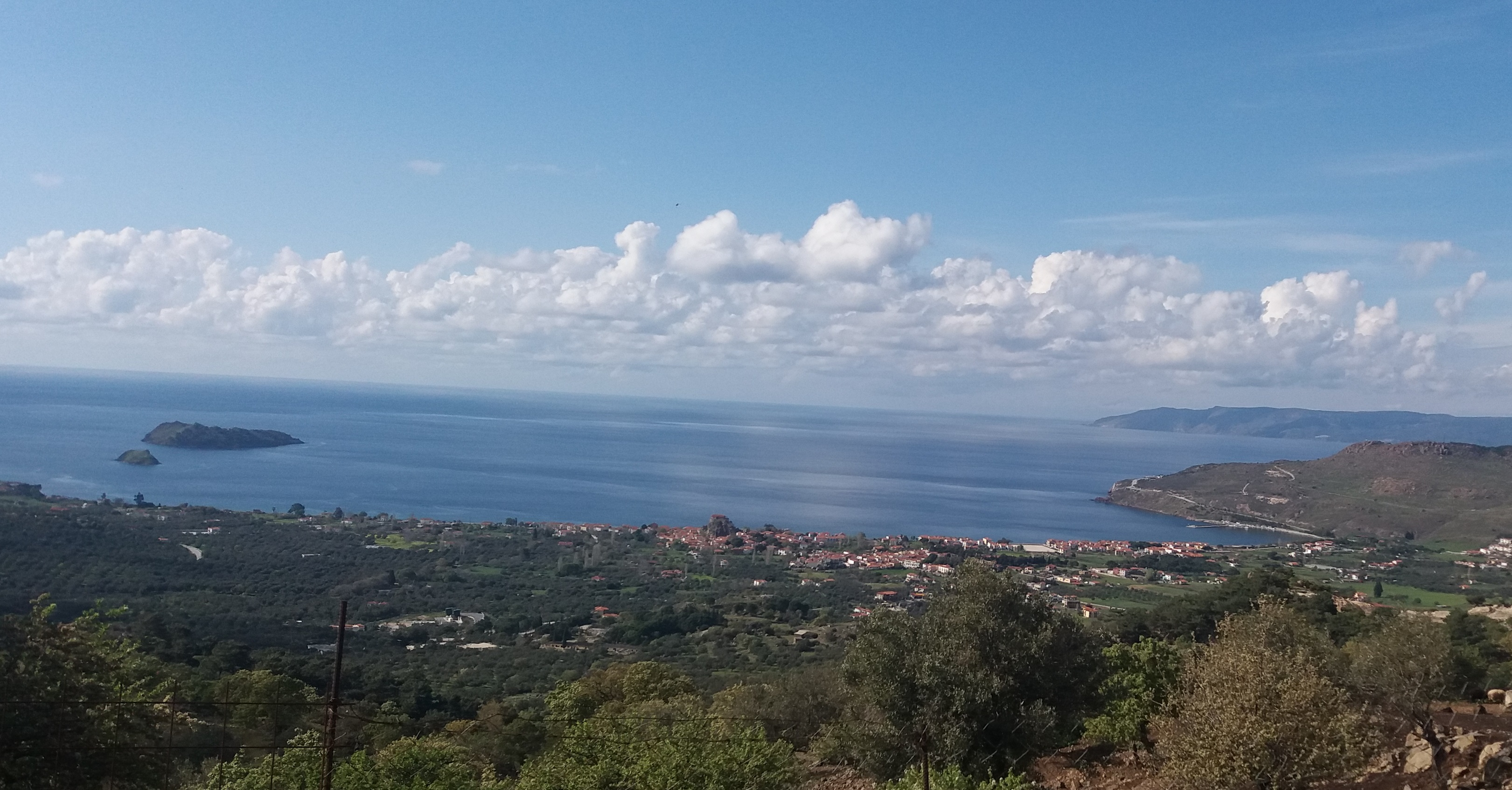
A panoramic view of Petra

== Historical population ==
Year	Community population	Municipality population
1981	994	-
1991	915	3,603
2001	1,246	3,749
2011	1,208	3,358
2021	1,149	3,029

== See also ==
- List of settlements in Lesbos
