= Mantamados =

Mantamados Μανταμάδος
- Municipal unit
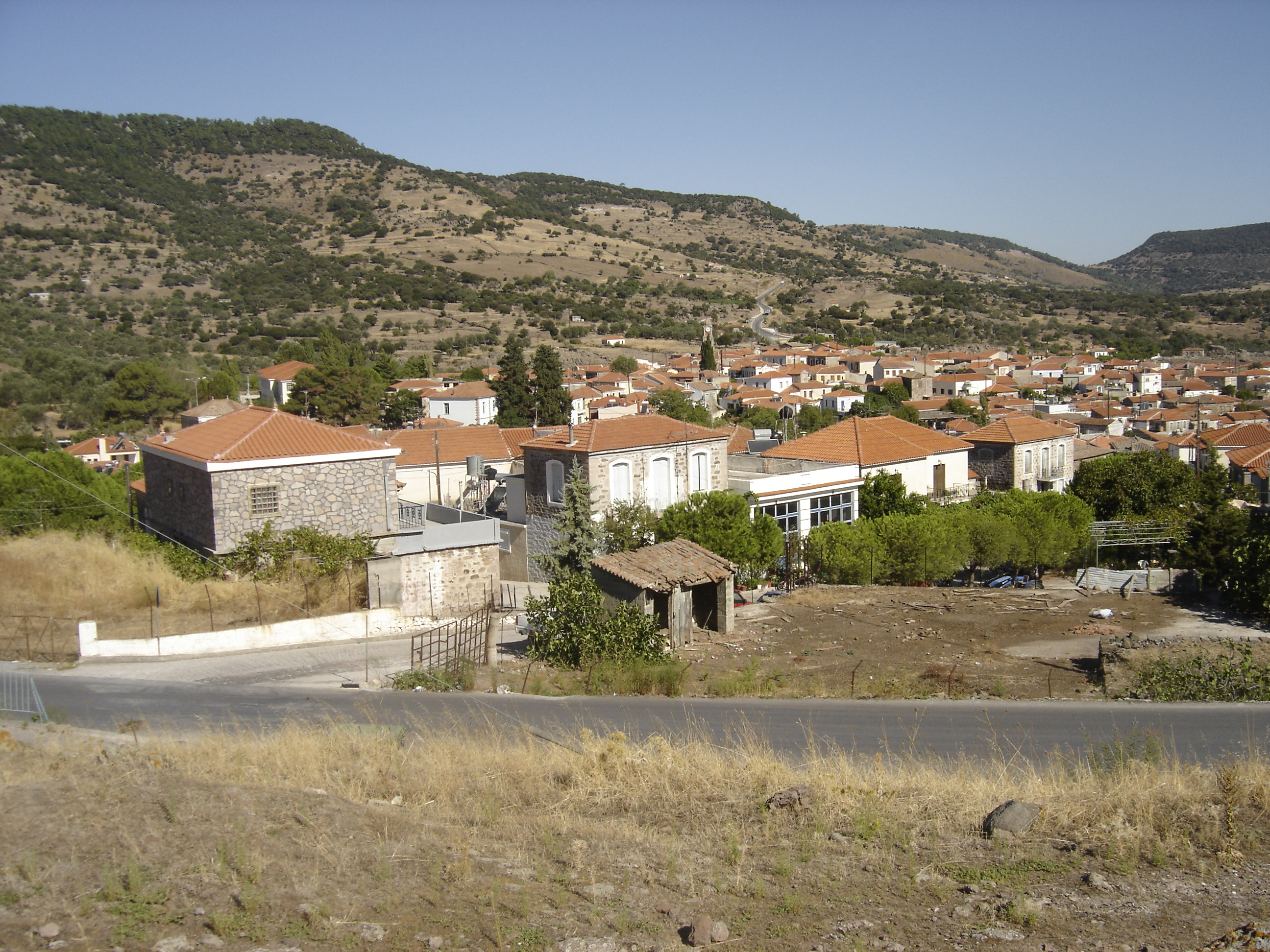

- Location within the regional unit

- Location within Greece
- Coordinates: 39°16′N 26°20′E
- Country: Greece
- Administrative region: North Aegean
- Regional unit: Lesbos
- Municipality: West Lesbos

Area
  - Municipal unit: 122.4 km^{2} (47.3 sq mi)

Population (2021)
  - Municipal unit: 2,070
  - Municipal unit density: 16.9/km^{2} (43.8/sq mi)
  - Community: 988
- Time zone: UTC+2 (EET)
  - Summer (DST): UTC+3 (EEST)
- Vehicle registration: MY

Mantamados (Greek: Μανταμάδος/Mantamaðos) is a town and a former municipality on the island of Lesbos, North Aegean, Greece. Since the 2019 local government reform it is part of the municipality of West Lesbos, of which it is a municipal unit. It is located at the northeast corner of the island, and has a land area of 122.435 km². Its population was 2,070 at the 2021 census. The municipal seat was the town of Mantamádos. Its largest other towns are Kápi, Kleió, and Pelópi.

Mantamados is very famous for the monastery of the Archangel Michael of Mantamados, popular among the believers of Greece, on the outskirts of the village. The island is also famous for its cheese (Ladotyri Mytilinis) and for its farms. It was also one of the few places in Greece to have a mayor belonging to the Communist Party of Greece until 2000.
