= Phaenias of Eresus =

4th-century BC Greek philosopher

Phaenias of Eresus (Ancient Greek: Φαινίας ὁ Ἐρέσιος, Phainias; also Phanias (Φανίας)) was a Greek philosopher from Lesbos, important as an immediate follower of and commentator on Aristotle. He came to Athens about 332 BCE, and joined his compatriot, Theophrastus, in the Peripatetic school. His writings on logic and science appear to have been commentaries or supplements to the works of Aristotle and Theophrastus. He also wrote extensively on history. His works have only survived in fragments quoted by other authors.

== Life ==
Phaenias was born in Eresos in Lesbos. He was the friend and fellow-citizen of Theophrastus, a letter of whose to Phaenias is mentioned by Diogenes Laërtius. He came to Athens around 332 BCE, and joined Theophrastus in the Peripatetic school. He was the most distinguished disciple of Aristotle, after Theophrastus. He wrote upon every department of philosophy, as it was studied by the Peripatetics, especially logic, botany, history, and literature.

== Philosophy ==
=== Logic ===
We have little information concerning his works on logic. He seems to have written commentaries and supplements to the works of Aristotle, which eventually became eclipsed by the writings of the master himself. In a passage of Ammonius we are told that Eudemus, Phaenias, and Theophrastus wrote, in emulation of their master, Categories and De Interpretatione and Analytics. There is also an important passage respecting ideas, preserved by Alexander of Aphrodisias, from a work of Phaenias, Against Diodorus, which may possibly be the same as the work Against the Sophists, from which Athenaeus cites a criticism on certain musicians.

=== Natural history ===
A work On Plants is repeatedly quoted by Athenaeus, and frequently in connection with the work of Theophrastus on the same subject, to which, therefore, it may have been a supplement. The fragments quoted by Athenaeus are sufficient to give us some notion of the contents of the work and the style of the writer. He seems to have paid special attention to plants used in gardens and otherwise closely connected with humans; and, in his style, we trace the exactness and the care about definitions which characterize the Peripatetic school.

=== History ===
Phaenias is spoken of by Plutarch, who quotes him as an authority, as "a philosopher well read in history." He wrote a sort of chronicle called Prytaneis Eresioi, the second book of which is quoted by Athenaeus. It was either a history of his native place or a general history of Greece arranged according to the period of the Eresian magistracy. He also concerned himself with the history of the tyrants, upon which he wrote several works. One of these was called On the Tyrants in Sicily. Another was entitled On Killing Tyrants for Revenge, in which he appears to have discussed further the question touched upon by Aristotle in his Politics. We have several quotations from this work, and among them the story of Antileon and Hipparinus, who killed the tyrant of Herakleia.

=== Literature ===
Concerning literary history two works of Phaenias are mentioned. In On Poets, which is quoted by Athenaeus, he seems to have paid particular attention to the Athenian musicians and comedians. On the Socratic philosophers, is twice referred to by Diogenes Laërtius.

Phaenias of Eresus was also among the first to make systematic collections towards a Greek musical history. His treatise and others, now lost, were key sources for compilers in Imperial times, such as Athenaeus and pseudo-Plutarch, and ultimately supplied much material for the late lexicons. "Such compilations reflect the Greek cosmopolitanism, with its more generalized forms of language, literature, art and music, which was the hallmark of the Hellenistic age."
