= Eresos-Antissa =

Eresos-Antissa Ερεσός-Άντισσα
- Municipal unit
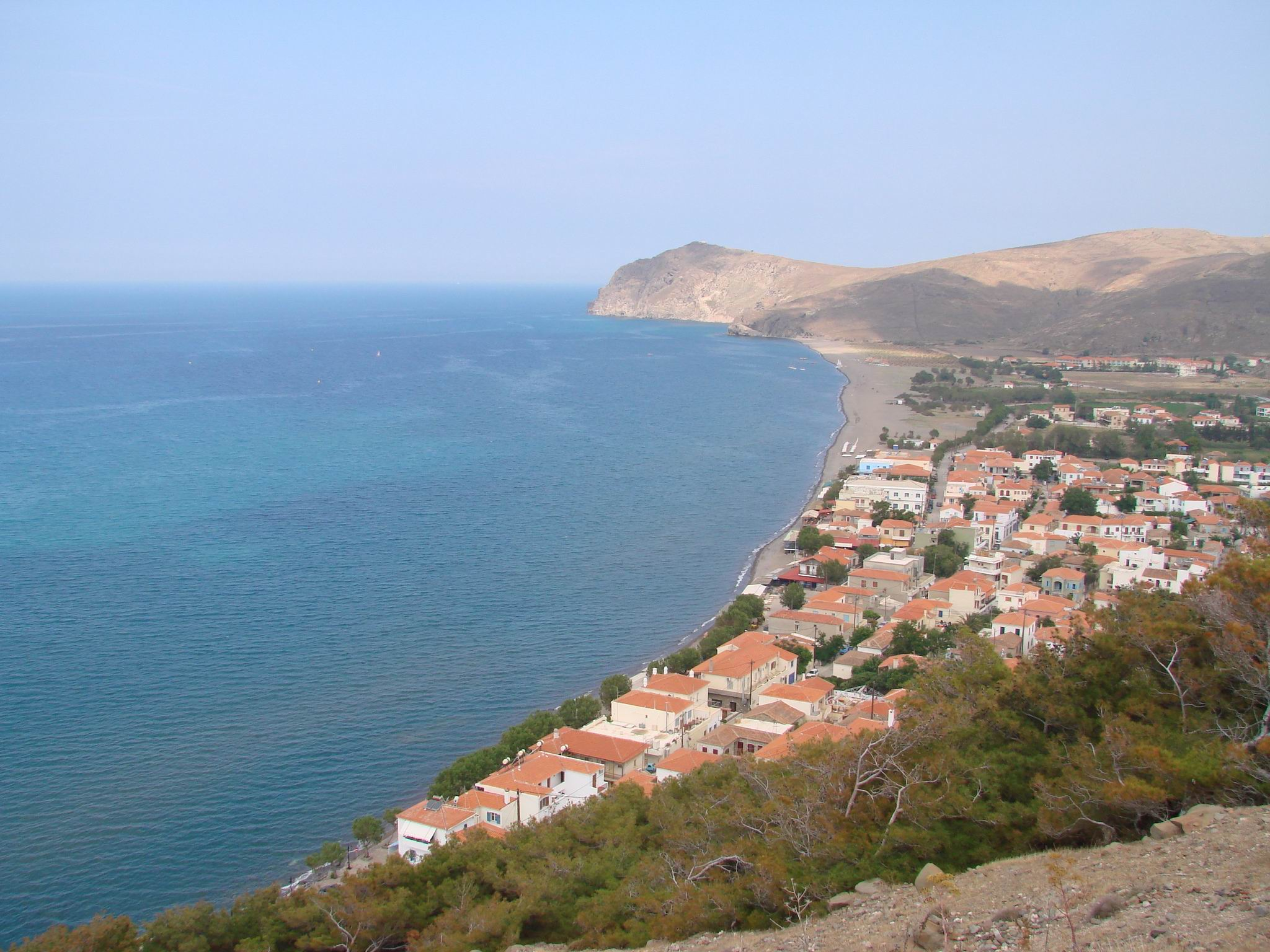

- Location within the regional unit

- Location within Greece
- Coordinates: 39°10′N 25°56′E
- Country: Greece
- Administrative region: North Aegean
- Regional unit: Lesbos
- Municipality: West Lesbos

Area
  - Municipal unit: 290.947 km^{2} (112.335 sq mi)
- Elevation: 50 m (160 ft)

Population (2021)
  - Municipal unit: 4,259
  - Municipal unit density: 14.64/km^{2} (37.91/sq mi)
- Time zone: UTC+2 (EET)
  - Summer (DST): UTC+3 (EEST)
- Postal code: 811 05
- Area code: 22530
- Vehicle registration: MY

Eresos-Antissa (Greek: Ερεσός-Άντισσα) is a former municipality on the island of Lesbos, North Aegean, Greece. From the 2010 local government reform until 2019 it was part of the municipality of Lesbos and since 2019 it is a municipal unit of the municipality of West Lesvos. It is located in the westernmost part of the island, and is the largest municipal unit of the island in land area at 290.947 km². Its population was 4,259 at the 2021 census. The seat of the municipality was in Eresos. The next largest towns are Antissa, Mesótopos, Vatoússa and Chidira.

== Notable people ==
- Terpander (7th century BC) poet and citharode
