= Agia Paraskevi, Lesbos =

Agia Paraskevi Αγία Παρασκευή
- Municipal unit
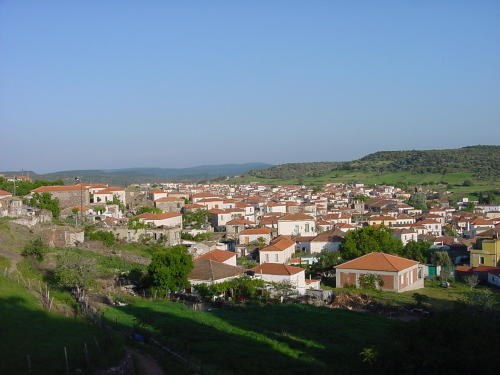
- The Village of Agia Paraskevi as seen from the Church of Agia Paraskevi

- Location within the regional unit

- Location within Greece
- Coordinates: 39°15′N 26°24′E
- Country: Greece
- Administrative region: North Aegean
- Regional unit: Lesbos
- Municipality: West Lesvos

Area
  - Municipal unit: 117.697 km^{2} (45.443 sq mi)
- Elevation: 97 m (318 ft)

Population (2021)
  - Municipal unit: 2,230
  - Municipal unit density: 18.9/km^{2} (49.1/sq mi)
  - Community: 2,053
- Time zone: UTC+2 (EET)
  - Summer (DST): UTC+3 (EEST)
- Postal code: 811 xx
- Area code: 225x0
- Vehicle registration: MH, MY

Agia Paraskevi (Greek: Αγία Παρασκευή, also Ayia Paraskevi is a village and a former municipality on the island of Lesbos, North Aegean, Greece. Since the 2019 local government reform it is part of the municipality of West Lesvos, of which it is a municipal unit. It is located in the central part of the island, on the northeast shore of Kalloni Bay. The village is named after the Church of Agia Paraskevi, which is found in a cave in one of the highest points of the town. The town cemetery is also located there. Presumably built over an old pagan temple, there is a well in the cave, and drinking the water from this well has been said to have conferred the Virgin Mary's protection. Agia Paraskevi is an old village that is becoming a powerful cultural and economic center for the island. The village is known for its old mansions, unique architecture and for its festivals. It is often referred to as the « Little Paris of the Aegean » (μικρό Παρίσι), due to its quaint agora and stunning architecture.

== Village layout ==
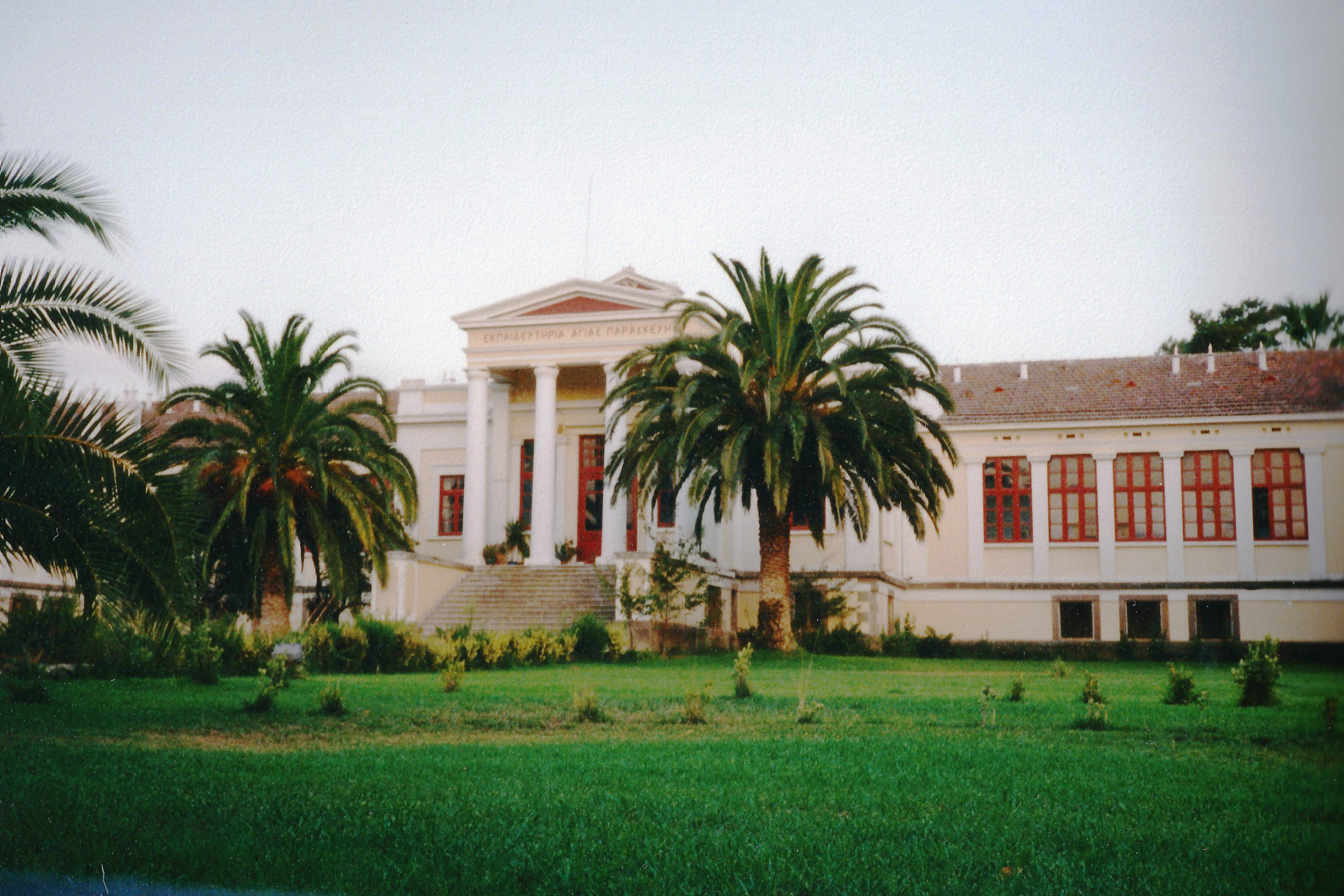
Municipal school

The village contains many traditional houses that shows the Venetian and Roman occupation of the island and is a rare, non-commercialized, non-tourist village — locals sit at tavernas that line the main street and socialize. The people are quite friendly and get around on foot, moped, horse, mule, or donkey; however, the automobile has largely supplanted animals as the main mode of transportation of both people and farm produce.

Near the village at Klopedi, are the remains of the ancient Aeolian temple of Napaios Apollo, while Messa, also nearby, boasts the ruins of a big Ionian temple (late 4th–early 3rd century BC), possibly dedicated to three Greek deities: Zeus, Hera and Dionysos. A monument from a later date, the Early Christian basilica of St. George, restored by the noted mediaevalist, Professor A. Orlandos, may be seen at Halinados, not far away.

The school building of Agia Paraskevi is of neoclassical architecture of the early 20th century (1922-1930s), has a rectangular "U" ground-plan shape, and shows a perfect symmetry at its openings. The formation of the school-yard area is also very significant. The construction of the school building, one of the most attractive on the island, was financed by revenues from the town’s oil-press, which today has been transformed into a multi-cultural center.

The oil press of Agia Paraskevi is a complex of stone-built buildings that serves as a characteristic sample of exceptional industrial architecture of the early 20th century (1910) on the island. Initially, it had been operating as an industrial complex (oil-press and corn-mill) and later on, until 1967, it ran as a community business. In 1984, with the support of the Prefecture of Lesbos, it was restored and transformed into a cultural center. The central building was turned into a multi-cultural hall with a 400-seat capacity, the oil storehouses were converted to a folk art museum while the 11 olives’ storehouses were transformed into modern guest-houses.

The only other significant town in the municipal unit of Agía Paraskeví is Nápi, about 3 km to the northeast. In the latest census in 2021 the municipal unit had 2,230 residents. Its land area is 117.697 km².
