= Hegelochus of Macedon =

Hegelochus (Greek: Ἡγέλοχος), son of Hippostratus, was a Macedonian general, and apparently the nephew of Philip II's last wife, Cleopatra. Hegelochus survived the disgrace of his relative, Attalus, who was murdered on Alexander the Great's instructions in 336/5 BC. At the battle of the Granicus, he led a body of prodromoi ("fore-runners, scouts"). In the following year Amphoterus was appointed commander of the fleet in Hellespont, and Hegelochus was placed under his orders, with a commission to drive the Persian garrisons from the islands in the Aegean Sea. In this he was fully successful, the islanders being themselves anxious to throw off the Persian yoke; and he brought the news of his success to Alexander in 331 BC, when the king was engaged in the foundation of Alexandria. In the same year he commanded a troop of horse at the battle of Arbela; and in the confession of Philotas, in 330 BC, he is mentioned as having died in a battle. According to the statements of Philotas, Hegelochus, indignant at Alexander's assumption of divine honours and the proskynesis, had instigated Parmenion to form a plot against the king's life.
