= West Lesbos =

West Lesbos Δυτική Λέσβος
- Municipality

- Location within Greece
- Coordinates: 39°14′N 26°09′E
- Country: Greece
- Administrative region: North Aegean
- Regional unit: Lesbos
- Seat: Kalloni

Government
  - Mayor: Taxiarchis Verros (since 2019)

Area
  - Municipality: 1,072 km^{2} (414 sq mi)

Population (2021)
  - Municipality: 24,721
  - Density: 23.06/km^{2} (59.73/sq mi)
- Time zone: UTC+2 (EET)
  - Summer (DST): UTC+3 (EEST)
- Vehicle registration: MY

West Lesbos (Greek: Δυτική Λέσβος, romanized: Dytiki Lesvos), sometimes also referred to as West Lesvos, is a municipality on the island of Lesbos in the North Aegean region in Greece. The municipality was formed from a decision by the Ministry of the Interior, published on 9 March 2019, which divided the pre-existing municipality of Lesbos. The seat of the municipality is in Kalloni.

The municipality encompasses 36 towns and villages in a total area of 1,072 square kilometers.

The economy of the Municipality of West Lesbos is 90% dependent on agriculture and tourism, mainly olive production, stock-farming, fishing, tourism, geothermy and other renewable energy sources.

Molyvos, Eresos (as well as its sister beach Skala Eresou), Petra & Vatera are the major tourism hot spots in the summer.

The municipality's first mayor, who currently still serves in the position, is Taxiarchis Verros.

== Municipal Units ==
The municipality consists of the following seven subdivisions:

| Municipal Unit | Seat |
|---|---|
| Municipal Unit of Agia Paraskevi | Agia Paraskevi |
| Municipal Unit of Eresos-Antissa | Eresos |
| Municipal Unit of Kalloni | Kalloni |
| Municipal Unit of Mantamados | Mantamados |
| Municipal Unit of Mithymna | Mithymna |
| Municipal Unit of Petra | Petra |
| Municipal Unit of Polichnitos | Polichnitos |

== Mayors ==
| Mayor | Party | Start | End |
|---|---|---|---|
| Taxiarchis Verros | Mazi apo tin Archi | September 1st, 2019 | |
