= Sourada, Mytilene =

District of Mytilene, Greece

Sourada (Greek: Σουράδα) is a district of the city of Mytilene, southern from the city's centre.

Until the late 19th century in the area could be found tower houses of the locals (called pyrgélia if they had one floor, and pýrgoi for two and more). In the late 19th (after 1880), the construction of many mansions for the most wealthy residents of Lesbos took place.

== Residents ==
- Odysseas Elytis, poet

== Sources ==
- Mytilene's topography
- Πυργόσπιτα Μυτιλήνης
