= List of settlements in Lesbos =

This is a list of settlements in the island of Lesbos in Greece:

- Afalonas
- Agia Marina
- Agia Paraskevi
- Agiasos
- Agra
- Akrasi
- Alyfanta
- Ampeliko
- Anemotia
- Antissa
- Argennos
- Arisvi
- Asomatos
- Chidira
- Dafia
- Eresos
- Filia
- Ippeio
- Kalloni
- Kapi
- Kato Tritos
- Kerameia
- Kerami
- Kleio
- Komi
- Lafionas
- Lampou Myloi
- Lepetymnos
- Lisvori
- Loutra
- Loutropoli Thermis
- Mantamados
- Megalochori
- Mesagros
- Mesotopos
- Mistegna
- Mithymna
- Moria
- Mychos
- Mytilene
- Napi
- Nees Kydonies
- Neochori
- Palaiochori
- Palaiokipos
- Pamfila
- Panagiouda
- Pappados
- Parakoila
- Pelopi
- Perama
- Petra
- Pigi, Lesbos
- Plagia
- Plakados
- Plomari
- Polichnitos
- Pterounta
- Pyrgoi Thermis
- Sigri
- Skalochori
- Skopelos
- Skoutaros
- Stavros
- Stypsi
- Sykaminia
- Sykounta
- Taxiarches
- Trygonas
- Vasilika
- Vatoussa
- Vrisa
- Ypsilometopo

== See also ==
- List of towns and villages in Greece
