= UFO sightings in Greece =

List of alleged UFO sightings within the nation of Greece

This is a list of alleged sightings of unidentified flying objects or UFOs in Greece.

== 404 BC ==
A fiery pillar appeared near Athens in 404 BC on a moonless, stormy night.

== 1946 ==
Ghost rockets were witnessed in Thessaloniki by British Army units in Greece. In an interview on 5 September 1946, Prime Minister Konstantinos Tsaldaris reported a number of projectiles had been seen over Macedonia and Thessaloniki on 1 September.

The Greek government conducted their own investigation with their leading scientist, physicist Paul Santorini. The government believed they were Soviet missiles over Greece, but the Greek Astronomical Society announced in 1967 that they were not missiles. After conferring with the U.S. Department of Defense, the investigation was stopped.

== 1954 ==
The Great 1954 Greek UFO flap. In 1954, a considerable number of UFO sightings occurred throughout South America and Europe. Clusters of UFO sightings are called "flaps":

- On 6 October, the residents and president of the community of Vrisa reported via telegraph to the police station of Lesvos that at 3:15 pm, the community witnessed a small starlike object manoeuvre over the village for 15 minutes. The object traveled northwest, then north, and then finally disappeared.
- On 8 October, the main police station of Lesvos received another telegram two days later from a village 50 kilometres (31 mi) north of Vrisa called Anemotia, reporting that a large luminous object with a tail was hovering over the small village at around 6:00 pm. The UFO was the size of a full moon and emitted gold and white light beams. It disappeared after three minutes traveling northeast.
- On 9 October, a luminous cigar-shaped object moving horizontally was witnessed by a 12-year-old boy hunting with his father S. Horiatellis near Stipsi. The object started moving vertically and broke into two cigar-shaped parts moving together. Newspapers in Turkey also reported the phenomenon was witnessed by Turkish scientists.
- On 12 October, another large luminous cigar-shaped object was observed in the night sky in Agios Georgios Nileias. Mr. Helias Voyagis reported it to the authorities. The UFO moved from east to west traveling slowly and disappeared over the horizon.
- On 15 October, the fourth UFO sighting on the island of Lesvos occurred nine days after the first. The police station of Agiasos received reports of a luminescent UFO hovering over the village via telegraph. The incident was witnessed by hundreds of locals. The object was hovering at 2,000–3,000 metres (6,600–9,800 ft) for half an hour. The object disappeared and reappeared after ten minutes, dividing into two separate parts that vanished in two different directions.
- On 17 October, a bright tail moving in circles was observed by Athena Gelemiris and Sophia Capaouras in Doxato. The strange object was red and changed colors as it was moving. It disappeared over the horizon after five minutes. The same UFO event was witnessed by hundreds of residents in the nearby village of Choristi.
- On 23 October, a UFO landing was witnessed by residents of the local village of Didymoteicho. According to testimonies, the UFOs were two cigar-shaped objects that landed at a particular point and stayed on the ground for 20 minutes. They took off with incredible velocity.
- On 26 October, a basket-shaped flying object emitting a blinding light was witnessed by Irene Sarris and Socrates Caraliamis in Antimachia. The UFO was heading towards the village, but it changed directions and flew away at high speed. According to news sources, George Cacamoundis reported seeing a winged man flying across the sky in the village that same evening.
- On 27 October, a disc was reported over Rhodes traveling at high speeds.
- In late October, an object like a flying frying pan was reported in Moudros.
- On 1 November, three witnesses in Pyrgos observed a blinding flash in the sky around 6:00 am traveling towards the Ionian Sea. One of the witnesses reported a small rocketlike portion.
- On 7 November, a very bright luminous object was witnessed by a group of hunters near Alissos at 4:45 am. The object briefly emitted a strong flash, leaving behind a pink tail. The object vanished towards Mount Erymanthos at high speeds.
- On 7 November, a silvery flying saucer was witnessed by Nikolaos Diamantis and A. Yaprakis over the Pagasetic Gulf at 10:30 pm. The saucer was moving over the gulf, rotating at high speeds. The UFO eventually exploded with a loud sound and a bright cloud was formed, which lit up the entire night sky.
- On 7 November, a flying saucer was observed in Komotini moving in circles and leaving behind three luminous dots.
- On 11 November, a witness named Stefanopoulos claimed to observe a luminous UFO while travelling between Faliro and Athens.
- On 11 November, a local priest named Rev. Nicholaos Exarchos, along with residents of Plagiari, witnessed a flying saucer emitting bright flashes of light for three minutes.
- On 12 November, eyewitnesses reported having seen a silvery object standing still in the air for five minutes at a height of 10 metres (33 ft) in Athens. The object moved upwards and became invisible, emitting a frozen exhaust gas similar to jet planes.
- On 16 November, two farmers, George Spirou and Mitsos Dimitriou, saw a bright object traveling at high speeds in Halki. The sky was clear.
- On 20 November, an 84-year-old man named Helias Coromilas claimed to see a small object resembling a car rolling on a field in a small village near Aigio at 7:00 am. The witness ran to warn the driver that he was heading for a steep cliff. The "car" suddenly took off without making a sound, flying into the sky and leaving a trail of dust.

== 1955 ==
- In September or October, a truck driver and hotel manager were driving over a mountain road in Agrinio and saw a luminous flying object overhead. The truck engine mysteriously stopped.

== 1959 ==
- On 9 December, a strong flash of light was observed at approximately 8:30 pm in the skies over the island of Kalymnos. It lasted 30 seconds, followed by a loud bang that shook the island for a minute. Afterwards, a rocket-shaped object appeared in the skies moving from east to west at a very high altitude. According to news sources, the sound and flashes were also heard in nearby Turkey.

== 1968 ==
- In mid-May, an automobile mechanic in Xiromero observed a bulletlike UFO with a flat bottom hovering overhead around 7:00-8:00 pm. He observed the object ascending and descending vertically. It was emitting smoke and flames. The object then flew horizontally, traveling west towards Italy. The mechanic was on a motorcycle during the encounter.

== 1985 ==
- On 3 October, fifteen fisherman and farmers witnessed a very dark flying object shaped like a huge cigar moving slowly in Komotini. The object stopped over the area and remained still. After a brief pause, the object began to travel north. The fishermen canceled the evening fishing trip and returned to their coastal villages to tell their story.
- On 14 December, three independent air traffic controllers at Naxos, Lemnos, and Corfu reported witnessing a cigarlike object passing overhead at extremely high speeds in excess of 3,000 miles per hour (4,800 km/h). The sightings were close to each other in time and the incident was documented at the Hellenic Air Force Headquarters. The conclusion drawn by officials was that it was a spaceship of some kind or American laser tests by the Strategic Defense Initiative.

== 1990 ==
- Georg N. Pantoulas interviewed witnesses of a UFO crash that ostensibly occurred near the village of Megaplatanos on 2 September, close to Atalanti. Around 3:00 am, shepherds and a small group of villagers observed six UFOs approaching from the north. One of the UFOs looked unstable. Bizarre lights emitted from the ships which did not make noise. Trantos Karatranjos stated that the troubled UFO lost altitude and crashed 500 metres (1,600 ft) from his position. He did not hear any noise, but the wooded area caught fire. The remaining UFOs stopped over the accident while two of them landed near the destroyed UFO. The fire was instantly put out and, during the entire evening, there was unusual traffic from the ground to the hovering UFOs. Light spots went up and down collecting debris until dawn. The UFOs disappeared right before sunrise. The entire village saw the event. The ground featured an oval-shaped burn with a cut pine tree in the center. There were also very small metallic pieces and wires around the crash site. The oval fire was put out in a unique way, leaving an unusual mark. The Hellenic Air Force arrived hours later, informed the village that it may have been a Soviet satellite or a plane that crashed, and took some of the pieces. Argyris Alevantas sent a piece of the UFO to the Space Research Institute in Brussels.

== See also ==
- List of reported UFO sightings
- National Observatory of Athens
- UFO sightings in Albania
- UFO sightings in Italy
- UFO sightings in the Canary Islands

== Bibliography ==
- Keyhoe, Donald Edward (1973). Aliens from Space The Real Story of Unidentified Flying Objects. New York, NY: Doubleday. ISBN 9780385067515.
- Vempos, Thanasis (22 November 2002). "The Great 1954 Greek UFO flap". Athens, Greece: Vembos. Archived from the original on 20 January 2021.
- Day, Marcus (1997). Aliens Encounters with the Unexplained. London, UK: Colour Library Direct. ISBN 9781858336626.
- Stothers, Richard (2007). "Unidentified Flying Objects in Classical Antiquity". The Classical Journal. 103 (1). The Classical Association of the Middle West and South, Inc. (CAMWS): 79–92. JSTOR 30038660.
- Kyriakidis, E. (2005). "Unidentified Floating Objects on Minoan Seals". American Journal of Archaeology. 109 (2). Archaeological Institute of America: 137–154. JSTOR 40024508.
- Wright, Dan; Harzan, Jan (2019). The CIA UFO Papers 50 Years of Government Secrets and Cover-Ups. Newburyport, Massachusetts: Red Wheel Weiser. ISBN 9781590033029.
- Hall, Richard (1964). The UFO Evidence (Unidentified Flying Objects). Washington D.C.: National Investigations Committee on Aerial Phenomena.
- Vempos, Thanasis (8 November 2012). "The Greek Ghost Rockets of 1946". Athens, Greece: Vembos. Archived from the original on 20 March 2023.
