= Vatera =

Coordinates: 39°01′11″N 26°12′00″E

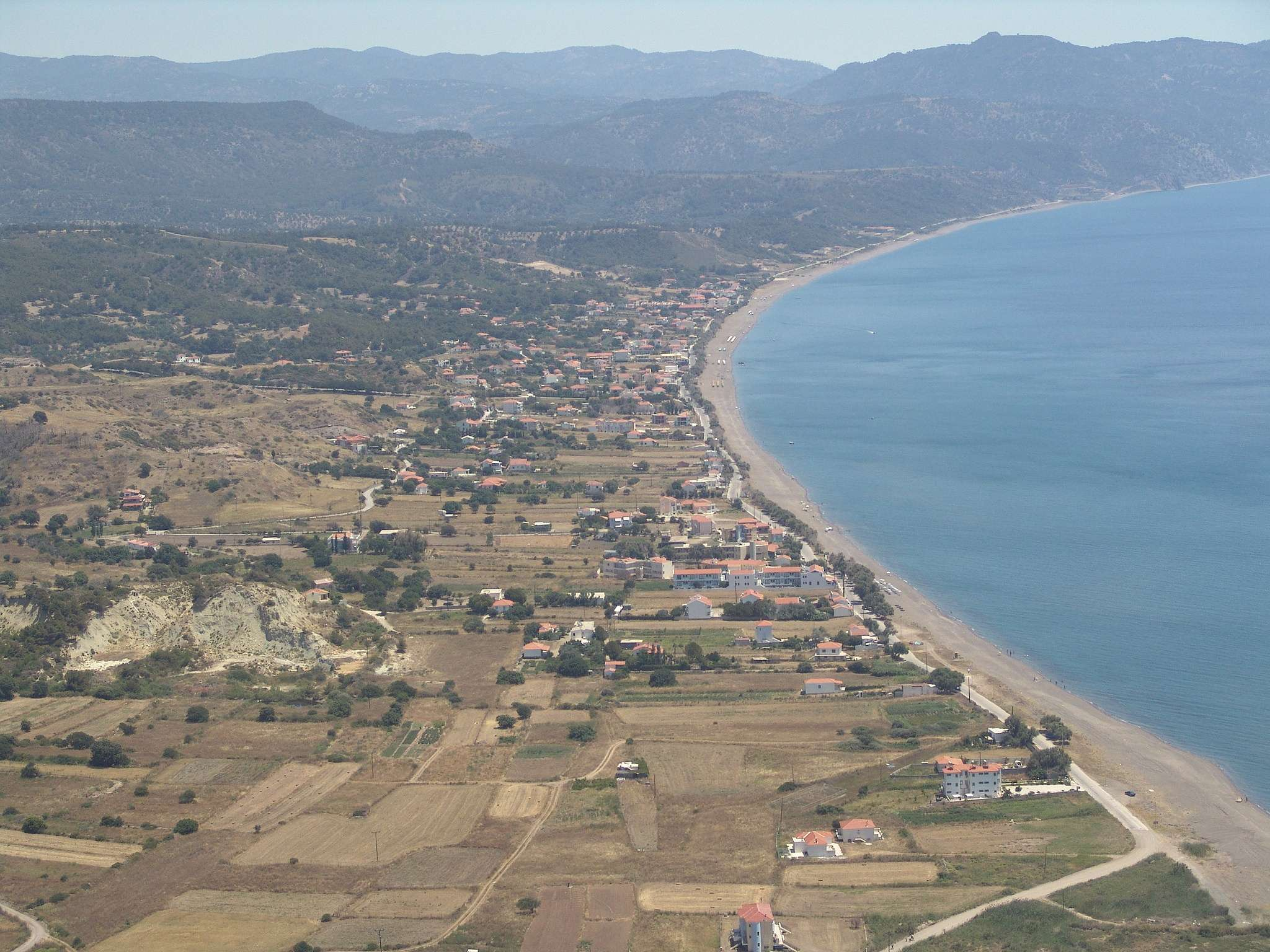
Aerial view of Vatera in summer 2004

Vatera is an 8-kilometer long sandy beach in the southern part of Lesbos island. Vatera is ideal for relaxing baths, playing with children, walking and cycling. The huge beach of Vatera offers the visitor an organized beach as well as a place where he can put up his umbrella. The name (Βατερά) comes from βάτα (vata, meaning "bramble"), in reference to prickly bushes that blocked the old mule-drive access.

It is 55 km in total from Mytilini. The 7 km long, sandy beach here, backed by vegetated hills and looking out to Hios and Psara, offers some of the warmest, cleanest swimming on Lesvos. Several family hotels and taverns with traditional tastes are across the biggest beach on the island.

3 km away is Agios Fokas, where foundations and columns stubs remain of the temple of Dionysos and an early Christian basilica.

The Vatera area hit the Greek news in 1997 when a palaeontologist, Michael Dermitzakis, confirmed what farmers unearthing bones had long suspected when he announced that the area was a treasure trove of two-million-year-old fossils, belonging to the Late Pliocene. The fossils include bones of stenoid horses (Equus stenonis), mastodons, a baboon-like monkey (Paradolichopithecus) and a giant tortoise (Cheirogaster), the latter the size of a small car.

Around two million years ago, Lesvos was not an island but was joined to the Asian mainland, and the gulf of Vatera was a subtropical shallow sea. The environment of Vatera at that time, was partly forested, partly open woodlands, with meandering rivers through the area flowing to the sea. The animals in question died somewhere near the rivers and their carcasses were transported by the water downstream. They got stuck somewhere at a bend, and sediments covered the remains until they were removed by Dermitzakis' team. In the nearby village of Vrissa, the University of Athens has established a natural history collection dedicated to the palaeontological finds.

== See also ==
- List of settlements in Lesbos
