= 2017 Lesbos earthquake =

Earthquake that occurred on 12 June in the Aegean sea

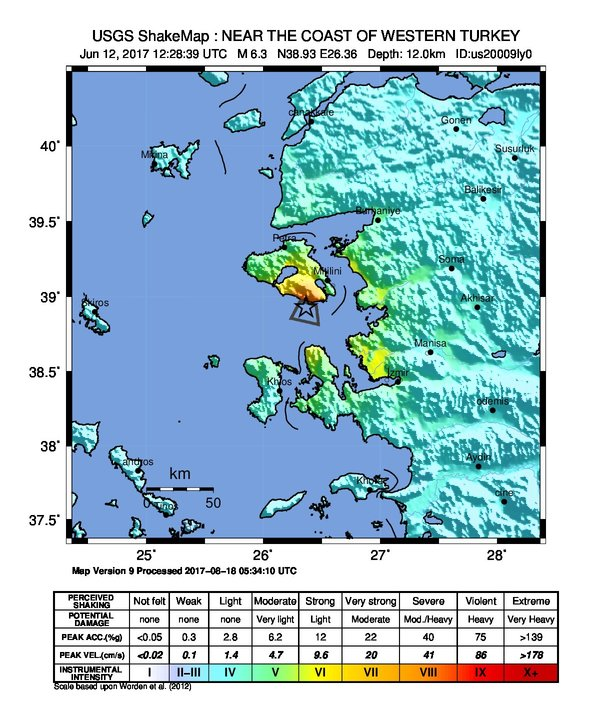
- USGS ShakeMap for the event
- UTC time: 2017-06-12 12:28:39
- ISC event: 615348170
- USGS-ANSS: ComCat
- Local date: 12 June 2017
- Local time: 15:28 (EEST) (UTC+03.00)
- Magnitude: 6.3 M_{w}
- Depth: 12.0 km (7.5 mi)
- Epicenter: 38.930°N 26.365°E
- Fault: Lesvos Fault
- Type: Normal
- Areas affected: Lesbos, Greece
- Max. intensity: MMI IX (Violent)
- Casualties: 1 killed, 10+ injured

The 2017 Lesbos earthquake occurred at 12:28:39 UTC on 12 June. The earthquake's epicentre was 5 km south of Plomari on the Greek island of Lesbos off the Aegean coast of Turkey. It had a magnitude of 6.3 on the moment magnitude scale and a maximum perceived intensity of IX (Violent) on the Mercalli intensity scale. Extensive damage was caused on parts of southern Lesbos, where there was one fatality and 10 people were injured. The earthquake was also felt in Turkey but no significant damage or injuries were reported.

Scientific Data on the 2017 Lesbos earthquake, collected by the Faculty of Geology and Geoenvironment of National and Kapodistrian University of Athens are published on-line in an integrated Story Map.

== Tectonic setting ==
The island of Lesbos lies within the zone of transition between two different tectonic regimes, strike-slip tectonics, associated with right-lateral movement on strands of the North Anatolian Fault zone (NAFZ) and extensional tectonics in the form of normal faulting within Aegean Sea plate. The NAFZ accommodates the westward movement of the Anatolian plate relative to the Eurasian plate, caused by the northward movement of the Arabian plate. At its western end, the NAFZ splits into two main strands, the northern one, which runs along the northern edge of the Sea of Marmara and the southern one that runs through the southern part of the Marmara region, both strands continuing into the northern Aegean Sea. Extension within the Aegean Sea Plate is a result of the rollback of the African plate lithosphere, which is subducting beneath it. The extension is aligned approximately north–south and major structures include the Gulf of Corinth rift to the west and the Büyük Menderes Graben to the east. Faults related to both of the tectonic regimes have been described from the area around Lesbos and many of both types have ruptured in historical earthquakes.

== Earthquake ==
The observed focal mechanism, the location of the epicenter and an estimated depth of 7–12 km, confirm that the earthquake was a result of normal faulting on the Lesvos Fault to the south of the island. This is also consistent with the results of Interferometric synthetic-aperture radar analysis of Sentinel-1 data. The inversion of seismic waveforms from the regional set of seismic stations show that the rupture propagated unilaterally away from the epicentre in a west–northwest direction.

There were no foreshocks before the mainshock, but it was followed by a large number of aftershocks that were concentrated to the east–southeast of the mainshock epicentre. The two largest aftershocks occurred at the eastern end of the aftershock zone and both had focal mechanisms consistent with strike-slip movement, indicating that these earthquakes resulted from rupture of different fault segments to the mainshock fault plane.

== Damage ==
The earthquake caused severe structural damage on Lesbos, particularly affecting older masonry buildings. The traditional settlement of Vrissa experienced the greatest impact, with about 80% of its buildings sustaining significant damage. The intensity of the shaking in Vrissa was estimated at IX on the EMS-98 scale. Structural damage primarily resulted from inadequate construction techniques and the poor quality of materials used. Minor damage was also reported from the Karaburun peninsula in Turkey.

Many masonry structures were built using river stones that were round and smooth, reducing their ability to bond effectively, especially when combined with weak earth mortar. This caused the masonry to disintegrate readily during the earthquake. Walls constructed without adequate transversal interlocking stones experienced delamination, resulting in significant local failures.

Several specific failure patterns were identified, including out-of-plane collapses, corner mechanism failures, overturning of gable walls, and damage concentrated around fireplace flues. The out-of-plane collapses were particularly prevalent due to the absence of structural ties and proper connections to internal walls or horizontal diaphragms. Timber-reinforced masonry structures generally performed better, showing more localised and less catastrophic damage, demonstrating the effectiveness of traditional reinforcement techniques.

Non-structural components, such as chimney tops, roof tiles, and decorative stone lintels, also suffered substantial damage. Detached monolithic lintels posed considerable risks, falling onto streets and entrances.

Post-earthquake inspections revealed that prior interventions, such as adding reinforced concrete beams and slabs to masonry buildings, often exacerbated damage. These modern interventions were ineffective when implemented on fundamentally poor-quality masonry, highlighting the importance of ensuring basic structural integrity before carrying out more advanced strengthening measures.
