= Benjamin of Lesbos =

Greek Enlightenment scholar, monk, and politician (1759–1824)

- Born: 1759; Plomari, Lesbos, Ottoman Empire (now in Greece)
- Died: 1824 (aged 64–65); Nafplio, Revolutionary Greece (now in Greece)
- Occupations: monk, scholar, politician

Benjamin of Lesbos (Greek: Βενιαμίν Λέσβιος; alternatively transliterated as Veniamin of Lesvos or Lesvios; 1759–1824) was a Greek monk, scholar, and politician who was a significant figure in the Modern Greek Enlightenment.

== Biography ==
Benjamin of Lesbos was born on the island of Lesbos in the town of Plomari. At the age of 17 he travelled to Mount Athos and there became a monk at Pantokratoros Monastery. In 1812 he was invited to direct the Patriarchal School in Constantinople, but declined this offer and instead settled in his native Lesbos to establish a school there. Later, in 1820, he taught at the Evangelical School of Smyrna. He also was associated with a school in nearby Ayvalık, where he was the principal instructor and earned the admiration of Lord Byron, who praised Benjamin as "a man of talent" and "a free-thinker". He died in 1824 in Nafplio, during the Greek War of Independence.

== Philosophical thought ==
Benjamin of Lesbos was exposed to West European philosophical theories in his studies and travels, and was notably influenced by John Locke, especially in the area of epistemology. He played an intellectual role in Greek culture and has been described as a "remarkable philosopher" in his own right.

== Legacy ==
Benjamin of Lesbos is commemorated in the Festival of Benjamin, held annually in late June in Plomari.
