= Paul Santorini =

Greek physicist and professor

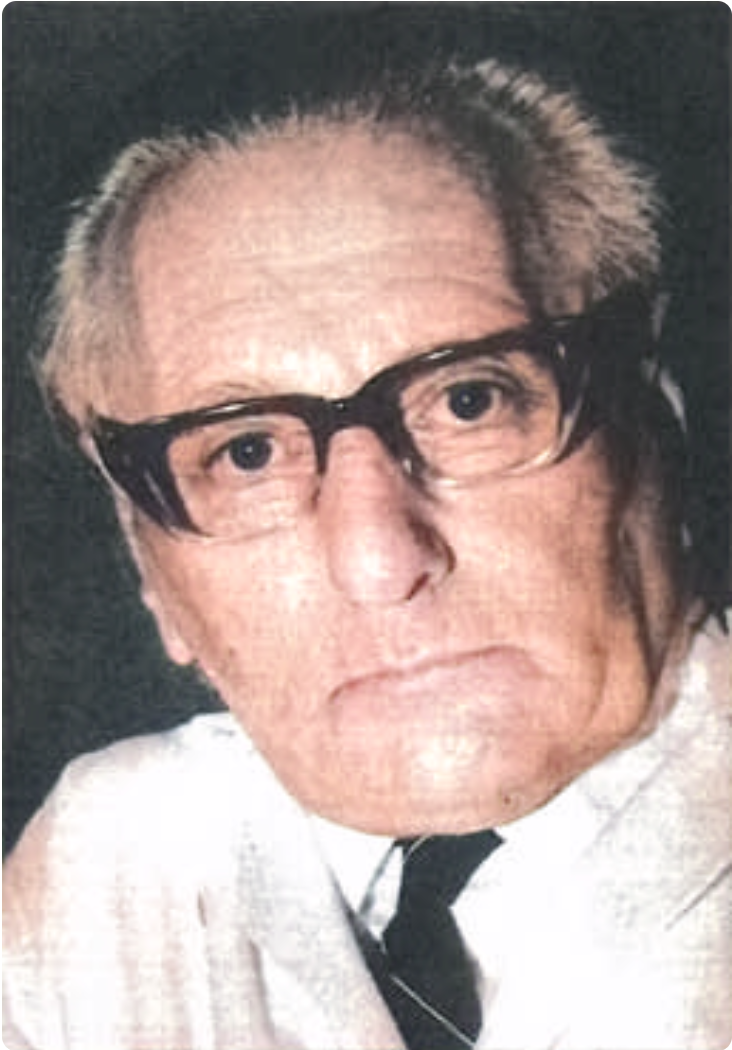
- Paul Santorini
- Born: June 1893; Odesa, Ukraine
- Died: October 19, 1986 (aged 93); Athens, Greece
- Resting place: Third Cemetery of Athens
- Education: University of Zurich; Swiss Federal Institute of Technology; University of Athens
- Known for: Hellenic Radar; Guidance for Project Nike
- Awards: Order of the Phoenix
- Scientific career
- Fields: Physics; Mathematics; Hydraulics; Electromagnetism; Astronomy
- Workplaces: University of Athens; NTUA; Agricultural University of Athens

Paul Santorini (Greek: Παύλος Σαντορίνης; 1893 – 1986) was a Greek civil engineer, experimental and theoretical physicist, mathematician, electrical engineer, astronomer, author, and professor. He published over 350 articles and conducted research in the fields of solar energy, wind energy, electromagnetic microwaves as weapons of war, high-frequency electromagnetic waves, high-frequency currents, structural engineering, and hydraulics. Later in life, he wrote papers in the field of the birth of the universe and proposed the multiple successive small bangs theory of the universe. Some of his papers also dealt with mankind and the universe. He is known within the UFO conspiracy community because of his involvement in the 1946 Ghost rockets incident in Greece.

Santorini was born in Odesa to a Greek father and an Italian mother and at a young age left Russia for Switzerland. By the age of 12, he attended prestigious high schools in Zurich. Around the same period, he was affiliated with Albert Einstein. He completed his studies in Zurich at the University of Zurich and the Swiss Federal Institute of Technology by 1918. He briefly worked in industry and took academic positions from 1936 until 1964 at three different institutions in Athens, Greece, namely, the University of Athens, National Technical University of Athens and Agricultural University of Athens. Santorini also worked for the Greek government in different sectors ranging from the office of the minister and the Hellenic Military.

Santorini frequently traveled to international conferences and was a member of several international scientific organizations, including the New York Academy of Sciences, Académie des Sciences de Toulouse, Institut des Hautes Études Scientifiques, and the Royal Society of Arts. He was awarded the Silver Cross of the Order of the Phoenix by the Greek government in 1938 for his outstanding work developing anti-aircraft technology. For his outstanding continuous achievements in the sciences, Santorini became a Commander (Ταξιάρχης) of the Order of the Phoenix in 1950 and Commander of the Order of George I in 1965. He was also a Freemason and a member of the Apollon Lodge of Athens. Santorini died at 93 years old and was buried at the Third Cemetery of Athens.

== Early life ==
Santorini was born in Odessa. His father's name was Eleftherios. The family name was originally Papadopoulos until July 1940. Records before 1940 are under the name Pavlos or Paul Papadopoulos. Santorini obtained his early education in Odesa until 1905. Due to the tumultuous political situation in Russia, he continued his studies in Zurich, Switzerland. He was accepted at the internationally renowned high school Concordia of Zurich at age 12. He took courses in the technical department and graduated after three years completing the requirements by 1908. Santorini also played the violin and received lessons from P. Koller around this period. He also became familiar with Albert Einstein. Regrettably, he was too young to attend the Swiss Federal Institute of Technology.

The Concordia high school allowed Santorini to attend the institution for an additional year of special courses in the field of natural science. One year later he attended another high school named Minerva from 1909 to 1910. At the second institution, he attended courses in the fields of physics and mathematics. By age 17, in March 1910 he took special entrance examinations to attend the University of Zurich. Around this period Albert Einstein was teaching courses in Zurich. Santorini attended some courses taught by the scientist. In his biography, Santorini explains that the world-renowned scientist showed a keen interest in ancient Greek philosophy and mathematics, and the young student had long conversations with him regarding the field.

Santorini was accepted at the University of Zurich in 1910 and the Swiss Federal Institute of Technology in 1912. Some of his professors included Aurel Stodola and Gabriel Narutowicz. He received a degree in civil engineering in 1917 from the Swiss Federal Institute of Technology and one year later in 1918, he received a degree in physics and mathematics at the University of Zurich. That same year, Santorini became an engineer at the hydroelectric installations of the Lóntschwerk II in Switzerland. He was part of the construction of an electric dam that produced 77000 kW with a height of 370 meters. During this period of his life, he specialized in hydroelectricity and electromagnetism.

== Private sector Greece ==
By 1919, Santorini moved to Athens, Greece, and continued working as a hydroelectric engineer for the Greek government. He studied the Edessa Waterfalls, Lake Vegoritida, and Agra Pella. He continued in this position until 1921. He worked in the private sector from 1921 until 1930. He became the chief engineer of a company in Athens from 1921 to 1925. Around this period he also wrote articles in the field of engineering under the pseudonym "Santo Rini". One of his articles published in 1921 was La Théorie du Rendement Économique Maximum D'une Conduite Forcée en Métal et le Calcul Rationnel de Ses Éléments (The Theory of the Maximum Economic Return of a Metal Pension Pipe and the Rational Calculation of its Elements). He was the head of static analysis for designing structures at Ergoliptiki from 1925 to 1927. Around this period, Santorini engineered a refined method for cement and finally from 1927 until 1930 he worked at Kronos Industries. In this position, he researched the elastic deformations of solid structures and wrote several articles about the facility. That same year, he took a government position and was one of the directors of Hydraulics at the Ministry of Agriculture, remaining in this position until 1946.

== Academic career and later life ==
The University of Athens awarded Santorini a degree in physics in 1933, and one year later he received a Ph.D. from the institution in the field of mathematics and physics. He became a professor at the School of Physics, which was part of the University of Athens. Santorini taught applied physics and experimental electromagnetic radiation from 1936–1946. He continued his work in electromagnetism and began building radiolocation systems for the Hellenic Military and was transferred to the High Command of Anti-Aircraft Defense a position which he held from 1936 to 1940. He built prototypes of electronic weapons. His research focused on developing instruments that used radio waves to determine the distance angle and radial velocity of objects relative to a specific position. The instrument was used to track aircraft. In his biography, Santorini claims that many of his prototypes were shared with different countries by the Greek government and that he was not credited for his inventions. He returned to the Ministry of Agriculture focusing his research on water measurements from 1940 to 1946.

From 1947 to 1964, Santorini became professor of experimental physics and Chair of the Experimental Physics Laboratory II at the National Technical University of Athens and also took a position at the Agricultural University of Athens as a professor and director of the physics laboratory. During this period in 1946 Greece witnessed a phenomenon known as Ghost rockets. Santorini was assigned to investigate the unidentified flying objects, he was 53 years old. By this point in his life, he was a distinguished professor and scientist who wrote hundreds of articles ranging from structural engineering, hydraulics, and electromagnetism. He became professor emeritus at the National Technical University of Athens and the Agricultural University of Athens by 1964, he was 71 years old. He continued writing until the end of his life and was a member of the New York Academy of Science, Acadèmie Des Sciences de Toulouse, Institut des Hautes Études Scientifiques, and the Royal Society of Arts. He also won several awards throughout his life for his distinguished excellence in the field of science. His academic writing can be separated by the subjects of his articles. Early in his career, he wrote about civil engineering, during the middle point of his career most of his works dealt with electromagnetic applications, and finally towards the end of his life he theorized about the universe. Santorini wrote over 350 articles and over 59 of his works were selected and discussed in his biography. He died at 93 years old and was buried at the Third Cemetery of Athens.

== Hellenic radar ==
During the spring on May 27, 1936, Santorini was part of a project to build anti-aircraft equipment for the long-distance detection of airships for the Hellenic Military entitled ecatometrico radar (centimetric radar system). A committee was assembled with a special request by the Hellenic military to the Department of Applied Physics of the University of Athens. Santorini proposed his experimental work. The device was tested and approved by the committee, and Santorini was named senior commander of anti-aircraft defense. By 1939, the equipment was functioning and able to observe aircraft up to 150 kilometers; the tests were conducted in Faliros. The equipment attracted the attention of the British military who were desperate to defeat the Germans. The Greek government shared the research the military conducted with its international allies during the desperate war times. Regrettably, Santorini's contribution went unnoticed by the international scientific community even though he was awarded Greece's highest honor around that period for his work in the field. He was also posthumously credited for building the guidance system for Project Nike and the proximity fuse used in the Hiroshima atomic bomb.

== Ghost rockets ==
In 1967, Santorini publicly stated that the 1947 Greek government investigation into the European Ghost rockets of 1946 were not missiles. He claimed the investigation was halted by senior U.S. military officials who knew them to be extraterrestrial in nature. He further explained to the Greek news that because there was no defense against the advanced technology of the aliens they feared widespread panic would result if the information was known to the public. Santorini became a media sensation among UFO conspiracy theorists because he was a credible scientist who admitted the existence of extraterrestrial phenomena.

== Literary works ==
Books and Articles by Paul Santorini
Date	Title	Title in English
1921	La Théorie du Rendement Économique Maximum D'une Conduite Forcée en Métal et le Calcul Rationnel de Ses Éléments	The Theory of the Maximum Economic Return of a Metal Pension Pipe and the Rational Calculation of its Elements
1921	Le Calcul Rationnel des Èléments d'une Conduite Forcée en Métal sur Base de la Théorie de son Rendement Èconomique Maximum	The Rational Calculation of the Elements of a Metal Penstock on the Basis of the Theory of its Maximum Economic Yield
1922	Procédé et Appareillage Pour le Jaugeage Photométrique de Faibles Cours D'eau	Method and Apparatus for the Photometric Gauging of Low Streams
1924	Beitrag Zur Konstruktiven Ausbildung Grosser Eisenbetonbehälter an Hand von Ausführungszeichnungen der Melassebehälter der Fabrikanlage Kronos in Eluesis (Athens).	Contribution to the Structural Design of Large Reinforced Concrete Tanks based on the Execution of Drawings of Molasses Tanks at the Kronos factory in Eleusis (Athens).
1925	Die Pilzdecke des Gärungsgebäudes "Kronos" in Eleusis	The Mushroom Cover of the Fermentation Building at the Kronos factory in Eleusis
1925	Das Fabrikgebäude "Kronos" in Eleusis bei Athens	The Factory Building Kronos in Eleusis near Athens
1925	Die Geknickte Pilzdecke des Alkoholgebäudes Kronos in Eleusis Athens und Betrachtungen Über Versträrkungsplatten bei Pilzdecken	The Buckled Mushroom Cover of the Alcohol Building at the Kronos Factory in Eleusis (Athens) and Considerations About Reinforcing Plates in Mushroom Covers
1928	La Solution Générale du Problème des Dimensions Economiques Maximum d'une Conduite Forcée en Métal et son Application Aux Calculs Pratiques Nouvelle Méthode 1925	The General Solution of the Problem of Dimensions and Maximum Economic Output of Metal Penstock and its Application to Practical Calculations New Method of 1925
1930	Experimentelle Ermittlung von Spannungsdifferenzen im Innern Einer Gleichaztingen Masse (insbesondere Beton) und Verformungsmessungen an Belasteten Baugliedern mittels Hochfrequenter Elektrischer Wellen	Absorbomicrometric Measurements and their Practical Applications in the Field of Civil Engineering. Principle, Construction and Theory of the Absorbomicrometer By Paul Santo Rini
1931	Les Mesures Absorbomicrométriques et Leurs Applications Pratiques Dans le Domaine du Génie Civil Principe, Construction et Théorie de L'Absorbomicromètre. Par Paul Santo Rini	Experimental Determination of Voltage Differences Inside a Mass of the Same Type (Especially Concrete) and Deformation Measurements on Loaded Components Using High-Frequency Electrical Waves
1935	Περί Φωτομετρικής Èγγραφής Μικροκινήσεων Àποκαλυπτομένων διά Πυκνωτού 'Εξερευνήσεως	Photometric Recording of Micromotions Revealed by a Condenser of Exploration
1937	Contribution à L'analyse Expèrimentale d'un Champ Èlectromagnètique Ultrafrèquent	Experimental Analysis of a Ultrafrequent Electromagnetic Fields
1939	Ueber Duodiodenfeldstärkemessungen im Unteren Dezimeterwellenband	On Duo Diode Field Strength Measurements in the Lower Decimeter Wave Band
1939	Mikrowellen Resonatoren	Microwave Resonators
1946	Fusée de Proximité et Cerveau Electronique H pour le Guidage Automatique d'Engins	Proximity Rocket and Electronic Brain for Automatic Guidance
1948	Μέθοδος καί Διάταξις Διά τήν Σπειροειδή Σάρωσιν τού Φωτεινού Στίγματος μιάς Λυχνίας Καθοδικών Άκτίνων Πρός Μέτρησιν Βραχυτάτων Χρονικών Διαστημάτων	Method and Arrangement for the Spiral Body of the Light Spot of a Cathode Ray Lamp for Measuring Short Time Intervals
1977	Τίτλοι και Ανάλυσις Επιστημονικών Εργασιών	Titles and Analysis of Scientific Works

Books and Articles by Paul Santorini
Date	Title
1948	Photographic Recording of Duration of Ultra Short Electrical Phenomena
1948	Direct Method of Measuring Wind Energy used by the National Technical University in Athens.
1958	Lowest Duration of Observable Physical Phenomena
1973	The Multiple Successive Small Bangs Theory of the Universe
1973	Philosophical Considerations in Connection with the Emergence of the Universe

== Bibliography ==
- Santorini, Pavlos E. (1977). Τίτλοι και Ανάλυσις Επιστημονικών Εργασιών [Titles and Analysis of Scientific Works] (PDF). Athens, Greece: National Technical University of Athens.
- Birnes, William J. (2004). The UFO Magazine UFO Encyclopedia The Most Compreshensive Single-Volume UFO Reference in Print. New York, NY: Simon And Schuster. ISBN 9780743466745.
- Berliner, Don (2008). Whitley Streiber's Hidden Agendas Series From Government Secret Files the Report that Shocked Congress UFO Briefing Document The Best Available Evidence. New York, NY: Random House Publishing Group. ISBN 9780307492272.
- Fawcett, Bill; Fawcett, Lawrence; Greenwood, Barry J. (1990). UFO Cover-up What the Government Won't Say. New York, NY: imon And Schuster. ISBN 9780671765552.
- Fowler, Raymond (2002). Ufo Testament Anatomy of an Abductee. New York, NY: iUniverse. ISBN 9781469796185.
- Santorini, Paul (1974). Επιστημονική Επετερίς [Epistēmonikē Epetēris]. Athens, Greece: National Technical University of Athens.
- Waser, Ernst; Vetter, Theodor (1913). Verband der Studierenden an der Eidg. Technischen Hochschule in Zürich Historischer Rückblick bei der Feier des fünfzigjährigen Bestandes [Association of Students at the Swiss Federal Institute of Technology in Zurich Historical Review at the Celebration of the Fiftieth Anniversary]. Zurich, Switzerland: Swiss Federal Institute of Technology.
- Liatis, D.; Pantazidou, P.; Dimitriadis, P.; Koutsoyiannis, D.; Chinis, E. (2017). "Παύλος Σαντορίνης (1893-1986, Καθηγητής στο ΕΜΠ 1946-64)" [Pavlos Santorinis (1893-1986, Professor at NTUA 1946-64)] (in Greek). Athens, Greece: National Technical University of Athens School of Civil Engineering. Archived from the original on August 17, 2022.
