= Kalamiaris palm forest =

Palm forest in Greece

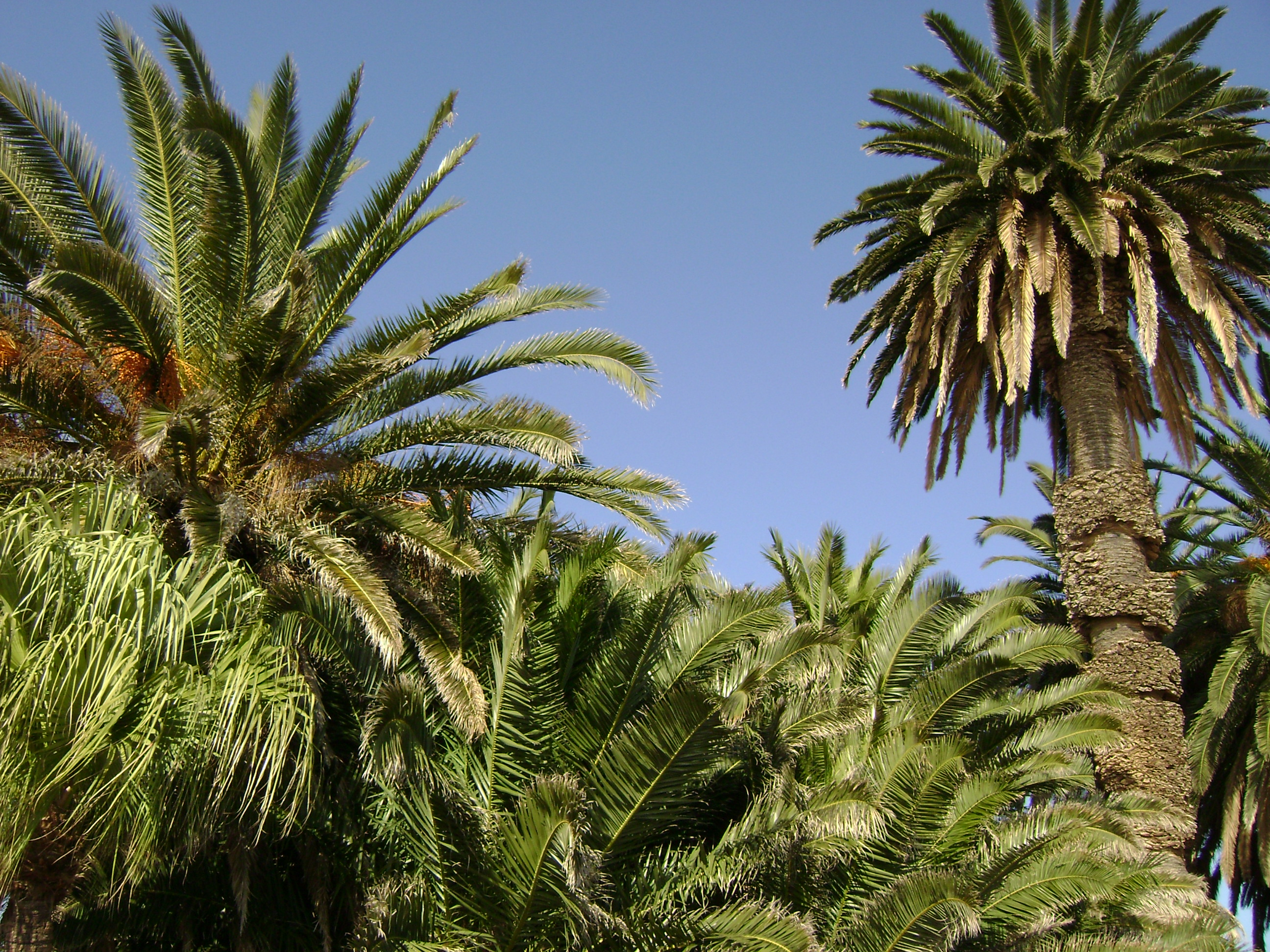
View of the forest

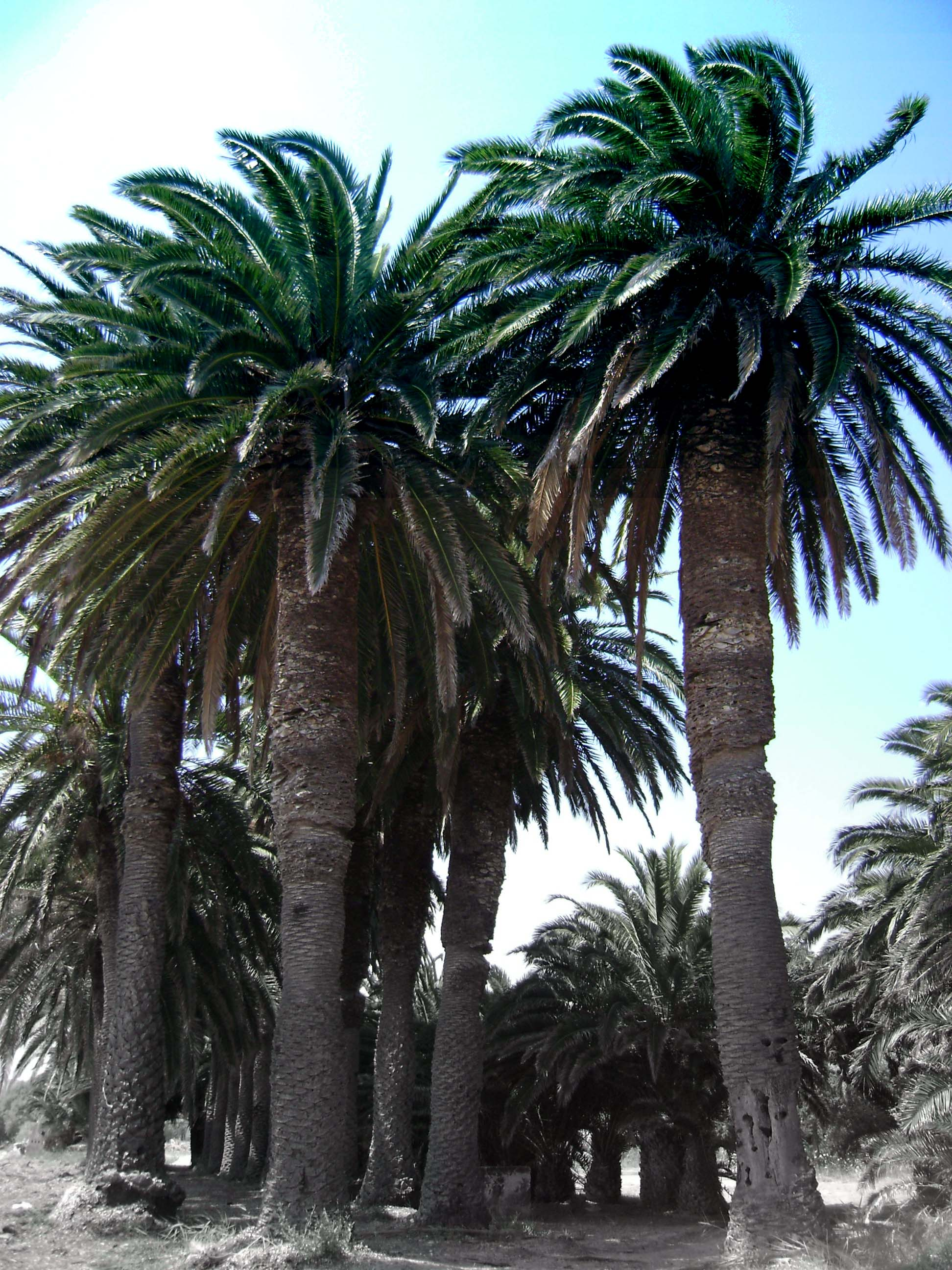
The palm forest of Kalamiaris

Kalamiaris palm forest or Panayouda palm forest (Kalamiaris is the northern area of Panayouda settlement) is a semi-natural small palm forest on the east coast of Lesbos island.

The original twenty-four Canary Island date palms (Phoenix canariensis) were planted by the English diplomat Atkinson who brought them from Egypt in the late 19th century. Later when those palms were starting to produce seeds, new palms began to grow. Today, a small but dense palm forest stands on the island. About 80% of its palm population is natural, and the forest has about 150-155 Phoenix canariensis palm trees. The forest continues to propagate new seed palms, but it has not been protected by local authorities. These seed palms are food for some local vegetarian animals or are disturbed by other means, which causes the forest to spread out very slowly.

== Text resources ==
- A small reference at the Greek net site
- A small reference for the palm forest surrounding protection at the Greek net site
- Translated from the article at Greek Wikipedia.
