= Parakoila =

Village on the island of Lesbos, Greece

Parakila Παράκοιλα
- Village
- Interactive map of Parakila
- Coordinates: 39°10′10″N 26°8′26″E
- Country: Greece
- Region: North Aegean
- Regional unit: Lesbos
- Municipality: West Lesbos
- Municipal unit: Kalloni
- Elevation: 51 m (167 ft)

Population (2021)
  - Total: 818
- Postal code: 811 07
- Area code: +30 22530

Parakila (Greek: Παράκοιλα) is a village on the island of Lesbos, Greece, built amphitheatrically on a low hillside between the Taxiarchis and Kardakis rivers, at an elevation of approximately 51 metres, surrounded by extensive olive groves and orange orchards. It belongs administratively to the West Lesbos municipality of the Lesbos Regional Unit. According to the 2021 census, it has a population of 818. The village is located 52 km from Mytilene and 11 km from Kalloni, on the provincial road connecting Kalloni–Parakila–Agra–Eresos. Parakila is part of the Lesvos UNESCO Global Geopark.

== Name ==
The name "Parakila" is most commonly derived from the Greek phrase para tin koilada ("beside the valley"): the small settlements of Androntikados and Chora, located to the south of the present site, were abandoned at an unknown date and their inhabitants gathered on the hillside above the valley, giving the new settlement its name.

The place name appears in written sources for the first time as "Parakella" in Genoese documents from the Gattilusio period (14th–15th centuries). In 19th- and 20th-century nautical manuals the area is recorded as Parakalon, Parakela and Parakela Scala, confirming the long maritime use of the anchorage at Skala Parakila.

== Geography ==
Parakila lies 7 kilometres west of Kalloni and approximately 4 kilometres from the sea, on a slope descending towards the Gulf of Kalloni. The landscape is characterised by alternating olive groves, orange orchards, forests of black and Calabrian pine, stream valleys with lush vegetation, and small plains. The area forms part of the Lesvos UNESCO Global Geopark, recognised for its geological and ecological significance. The ravines of Potamia, Christos–Faslistria and Kali Lagkada serve as biodiversity corridors and host rare species of flora and fauna.

== History ==
=== Antiquity ===
The area shows continuous human presence from antiquity, as evidenced by the archaeological sites of Trianta, Massara and Apolasmena, where ceramics, building foundations, wall sections and traces of Early Christian basilicas have been identified. Remnants of Pelasgian walls, characteristic of the prehistoric fortification architecture of Lesbos, are also preserved in the wider area. Geographically, the territory of Parakila bordered the ancient city-state of Antissa, whose southeastern limits extended to this area.

=== Byzantine period and first Genoese incursions ===
During the Byzantine period the area was incorporated into the administrative system of Kalloni and maintained an agricultural character with stable settlement. In 1334, the castle of Parakila was temporarily seized by the Genoese governor of Phocaea, Domenico Cattaneo, who attempted unsuccessfully to wrest Lesbos from Byzantine control; he was expelled both from Lesbos and from Phocaea in 1335. The existence of Early Christian churches and architectural remains suggests an organised community already in early Christian times.

=== Medieval period – Genoese rule (1355–1462) ===
During the rule of the Gattilusio family, Parakila is mentioned in Genoese documents as Parakella — the earliest known written form of the toponym. In the 15th century, Parakila became an important centre for the production of alum (Greek: στυπτηρία), a strategically valuable mineral used in tanning and fabric dyeing across Europe. Alum was exported via the anchorage of Skala Parakila, which served as a natural harbour and trading post for the region. The medieval tower of Parakila was part of this thriving settlement (see below).

=== Ottoman period (1462–1912) ===
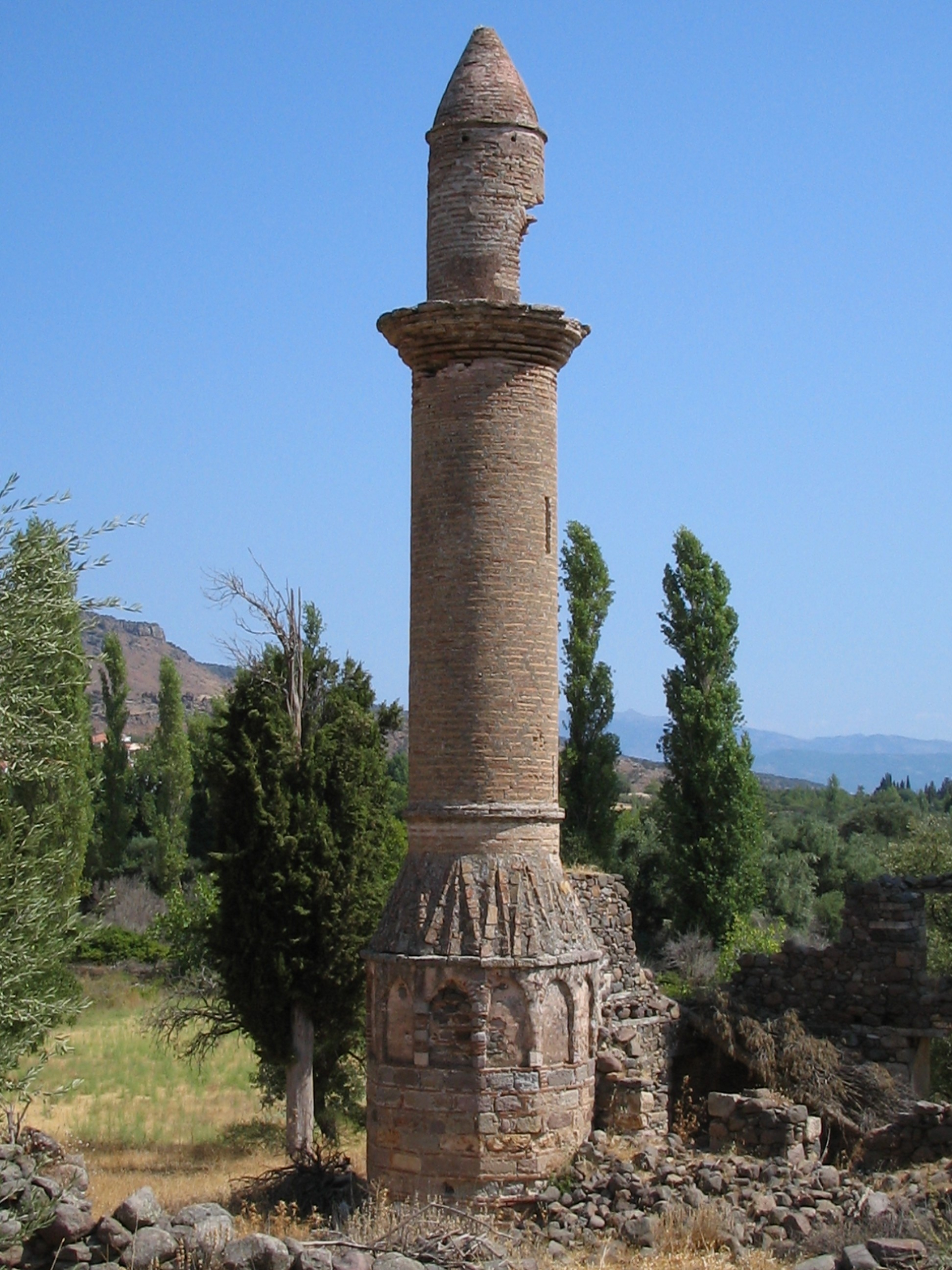
The Ottoman minaret in the Muslim cemetery of Parakila

Following the Ottoman conquest of Lesbos in 1462, Parakila remained one of the most densely populated settlements on the island. According to Ottoman tax registers (tapu tahrir defterleri), in 1520 the village had 253 Christian and 3 Muslim households, while by 1548 this had risen to 382 Christian and 5 Muslim households, with 31 watermills in operation — evidence of significant agricultural output. In 1521, the Ottoman admiral Piri Reis described the valley of Parakila, noting its plane trees, bitter orange trees and lemon trees, and recording the watermills at work in the area.

Significant monuments from the Ottoman period survive in the village: the minaret of the former mosque — one of the few still standing on Lesbos — the Ottoman baths (hammam) and the Muslim cemetery.

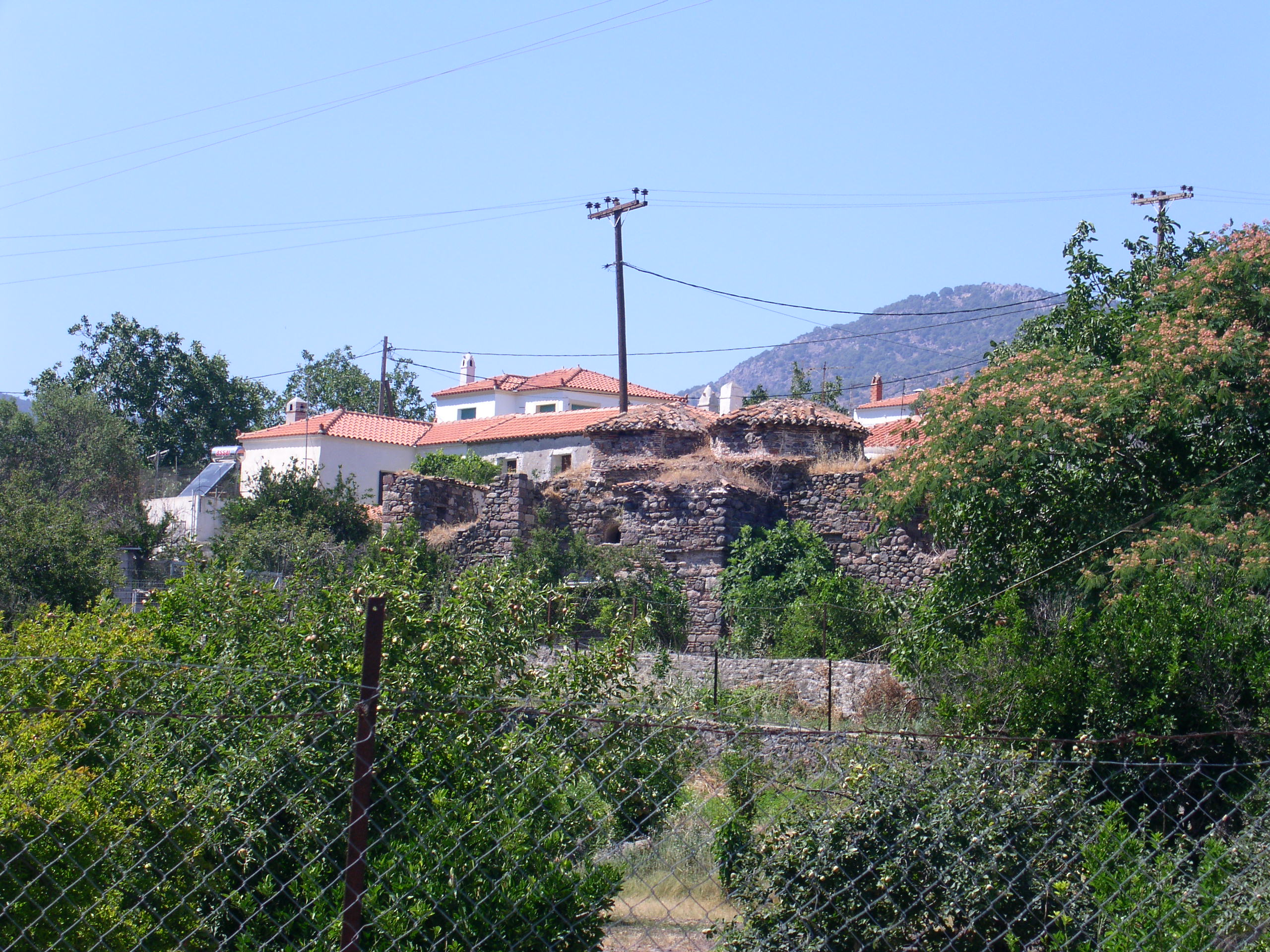
The Ottoman hammam in Parakila

=== Modern Greece ===
Parakila became part of the Greek state in 1912, following the liberation of Lesbos during the First Balkan War. During World War II, the village came under Italian and subsequently German occupation, without major military operations taking place in the area. In the 1950s, the villagers constructed a small hydroelectric installation using local streams, making Parakila one of the first villages on Lesbos to have electricity before connection to the national grid.

After the war, Parakila followed the general demographic trend of the Greek countryside, with a gradual decline in population due to urbanisation and emigration.

=== Population ===
Census year	Population
1991	1,017
2001	902
2011	818
2021	818

Source: Hellenic Statistical Authority (ELSTAT).

== Archaeology and monuments ==
=== Medieval tower ===
At the southwestern edge of the village, the remains of a medieval tower survive within the courtyard of a private house. The tower had a square plan with a base of 7.50 m and today only the southern wall is preserved to any height, with traces of the other sides. Its construction technique indicates a Late Byzantine date. It is unclear whether the tower formed part of the castle of Parakila — recorded in 14th-century historical sources — or was a standalone residential tower (pyrgokatikoikia).

=== Other archaeological sites ===
At the sites of Trianta, Massara and Apolasmena, ceramics, building foundations, wall sections and traces of Early Christian basilicas have been identified. Remnants of Pelasgian walls are also preserved in the wider area.

The stone bridge of Parakila, preserved in excellent condition, is a characteristic example of traditional Ottoman-period masonry architecture and served to cross the streams descending from the hills towards the Gulf of Kalloni. The minaret of the former mosque — one of the few surviving on Lesbos — and the Ottoman hammam are also important monuments of the Ottoman period.

== Nature and landscape ==
The area around Parakila is one of the most diverse natural landscapes in western Lesbos, featuring olive groves, orange orchards, forests of black pine (Pinus nigra) and Calabrian pine (Pinus brutia), deep ravines and coastal areas at Skala Parakila. The natural environment is part of the Lesvos UNESCO Global Geopark.

One of the most significant elements of the local flora is the Pontic rhododendron (Rhododendron luteum), one of the rarest plant species in Greece, which forms impressive populations in the Potamia, Christos–Faslistria and Kali Lagkada ravines. The ravines host plane trees, alder, willows and rich birdlife, and serve as biodiversity corridors.

The Parakila Lagoon, located 1 km south of the village on the west side of the Gulf of Kalloni, is a recognised birdwatching site within the Lesvos Geopark, attracting migratory waders, herons, egrets and waterfowl.

== Churches and religious monuments ==
=== Church of the Archangels (Taxiarchis) ===
The patron saint of Parakila is the Archangel (Taxiarchis), whose church stands at the centre of the village and is the most important religious monument in the area. It is a three-aisled basilica with a flat wooden ceiling, bearing successive phases of construction. An inscription above the courtyard gate bears the date 1758, while the current narthex was added in 1953. A monastery dedicated to the Archangel in the area is already recorded in the Ottoman registers of 1548.

The church possesses a woodcarved iconostasis of outstanding craftsmanship, inscribed "Stais Zografos 1860". Notable portable icons dating from the 18th and 19th centuries include Christ and the Virgin Mary by Fotios and Petros "of Chios" (1784), Saint Charalampos (1768) and the Archangel (1866). In the churchyard stands a fountain dated 1888, while two further fountains dedicated by hieromonks (1811 and 1904) survive in the area.

=== Small Taxiarchis chapel ===
To the west of the village, in the river valley, stands the chapel of the "Small Taxiarchis" (1929), reached by a stone-paved path after crossing the stone bridge. It incorporates a plaque from an earlier church and shelters broken Ottoman grave slabs in its interior. The ancient plane tree that shades it is considered a natural monument.

=== Other religious monuments ===
The chapel of Agia Dosia is a significant pilgrimage site, where the feast of Lamproparaskeui (the Friday of Bright Week, the week after Easter) is celebrated. Also in the area are the chapel of Kryfi Panagia (Hidden Virgin Mary), set within dense woodland, and the Monastery of Voukolon to the southwest of the village. From the Ottoman period, the minaret of the former mosque, the hammam and the Muslim cemetery survive as important monuments of the area's multicultural past.

== Folklore, customs and festivals ==
=== Festival of the Archangels (7–8 November) ===
The largest festival of the village is held on 7 and 8 November at the Church of the Archangels. A central feature is the traditional bull ceremony: a bull is led through the village before being slaughtered, and from its meat keskeki (Greek: κεσκέκι) is prepared — a traditional dish of Anatolian origin made from meat and pounded wheat, cooked collectively in large cauldrons and distributed among the faithful after vespers. The custom has Anatolian roots and is linked to fertility rites that survived for centuries in the northeastern Aegean.

=== Festival of the Holy Apostles (29 June) ===
Celebrated on 29 June with the participation of villagers and cultural associations.

=== Feast of Saint Euthymios Agritellis (29 May) ===
The memory of Saint Euthymios, martyr bishop and native of Parakila, is commemorated on 29 May at the Church of the Archangels, with the participation of faithful from across Lesbos.

=== Festival of Agia Dosia (Lamproparaskeui) ===
Held in the forest of Agia Dosia on the Friday of Bright Week, with outdoor cooking, live music and traditional dances. Organised annually by the Cultural Association "Rododendro".

=== Festival of Trachanas (August) ===
Each August, trachanas (a traditional fermented grain product) is prepared publicly using traditional techniques, accompanied by music and dancing.

=== Cultural associations ===
- Women's Agricultural Cooperative of Parakila (founded in 2001 by eleven women)
- Cultural Association of Parakila "Rododendro"
- Sports Club "Andronikás"

== Economy ==
The economy of Parakila has historically been one of the most dynamic in western Lesbos, combining alum production, weaving, agriculture, livestock farming and fishing.

=== Alum production (Medieval period) ===
In the 15th century, Parakila was an important centre for the production of alum, a mineral of strategic value for fabric dyeing and tanning in Europe, exported via the anchorage of Skala Parakila.

=== Agricultural production (Ottoman period) ===
According to the Ottoman registers of 1548, Parakila had 31 watermills in operation and produced cereals, olive oil, grapes and livestock products.

=== Weaving – The Parakila flokati ===
In the late 1960s, three locals — Vassilis Chamalellis, Manolis Chamalellis and Giotis Sarantidis — founded the "Klostоyfantourgia Lesvou O.E.", a textile company that produced the celebrated Parakila flokati (a type of hand-woven wool rug) and fine woollen blankets, reaching both the Greek and international markets. The enterprise used both New Zealand and locally sourced wool, processed in the traditional watermills of the area.

=== Hydroelectric works (1950s) ===
In the 1950s, the villagers constructed a small hydroelectric installation using local streams, making Parakila one of the first villages on Lesbos to have electricity before connection to the national grid.

=== Contemporary economy ===
Today the economy rests on olive cultivation, orange growing, livestock farming and small-scale fishing through Skala Parakila. The Women's Agricultural Cooperative of Parakila, founded in 2001 by eleven women, produces spoon sweets, jams, handmade pasta and baked goods, promoting the gastronomic identity of the village.

== Notable people ==
=== Saint Euthymios of Zela (Efstratios Agritellis, 1876–1921) ===
Saint Euthymios of Zela, born Efstratios Agritellis, was born in Parakila on 6 July 1876 to a farming family. At the age of nine he was dedicated to the Leimonos Monastery, where the abbot tonsured him a monk under the name Euthymios; he graduated from the monastery's Leimonias school in 1892. In 1900 he was sent to the Halki Seminary, where he studied until 1907.

In 1912 he was consecrated Bishop of Zela and settled in Pontus, where he engaged in intensive pastoral, educational and national activity, founding schools and churches across the vast Metropolis of Amasya. During the Pontic Greek genocide he supported the civilian population and refused to abandon his seat. On 21 January 1921 he was arrested by the Kemalist authorities in Amasya and imprisoned. On 29 May 1921, exhausted from hardships and deprivation, he died in custody; his body was subsequently hanged in the central square of the town. In 1993 he was numbered among the saints by the Holy Synod of the Church of Greece (Encyclical 2556, 5 July 1993), and his memory is celebrated on 29 May.

=== Aris Tastanis (1953–2013) ===
Aris Tastanis (Greek: Άρης Ταστάνης) was a poet, prose writer and disability rights activist, born in Parakila in 1953. The early onset of muscular dystrophy led his family to move to Athens in 1966; from the age of 22 he used a wheelchair. The poet Tasos Leivaditis described him as "the Theophilos of poetry". He published twelve books of poetry, prose and essays, and his first poem "Mporeís!" ("You Can!") was translated into 15 languages. He was an active member of the Greek left and the disability rights movement, participating in the Democratic Youth of Lambrakis, EKON Rigas Feraios and the Society of Greek Writers. In 1983 he founded the folkloristic journal Ta Parakoiliotika (Greek: Τα Παρακοιλιώτικα), dedicated to his birthplace. He died on 20 September 2013.

== Bibliography ==
- Wright, Christopher. The Gattilusio Lordships and the Aegean World 1355–1462. Leiden: Brill, 2014.
- Stasolla, F. et al. Alum Landscapes: Production, Trade and Society in the Medieval Mediterranean. 2020.
- Konstantellis, G. Kalloni – An Itinerary through Central Lesbos (Greek: Καλλονή – Οδοιπορικό στην κεντρική Λέσβο). Mytilene, 1998.
- Sarantidis, Giotis G. The Parakila Flokati on the World Market (Greek: Η παρακοιλιώτικη φλοκάτη στην παγκόσμια αγορά). Aiolida, 2013.
- Petrocheilos. Flora of Lesvos. 1999.
- Axiotis, Makis. Walking Lesbos (Greek: Περπατώντας τη Λέσβο), Vols. A′ and B′.
- Papathanasiou, Manolis. "Tower at Parakila". Kastrologos.
- British Hydrographic Office. Mediterranean Pilot. London, 1941.
- United States Hydrographic Office. Sailing Directions for the Mediterranean, Vol. V. Washington, 1945.
