= UFO sightings in Spain =

This is a list of alleged sightings of unidentified flying objects or UFOs in Spain.

== 1976 ==
- On 12 November 1976, two soldiers (José María Trejo and Juan Carrizosa Luján) claimed to have seen and shot at a being of unknown origin at the Base Aérea de Talavera la Real (Talavera la Real Air Base), located in the Spanish province of Badajoz. Both were on patrol at 1:45 am, when they heard a noise similar to radio interference which later became an acute whistle. When it ceased five minutes later, they spotted an intensely bright light in the sky that lasted 15 seconds. Another guard arrived with a guard dog, and they began searching around the area. Eventually, they heard the sound of eucalyptus twigs being broken. The dog was released and rushed to the source of the noise, but returned confused and stumbling, a process which was repeated a couple of times. Eventually, the dog started to circle them, which is a technique meant to protect guard dogs' handlers. Trejo then allegedly spotted a human-shaped green light to his left. The being was about 3 metres (9.8 feet) tall. It seemed to be formed of small light points, and the brightness was more intense along its edges. The head was small and covered by something resembling a helmet. The arms were very long and had no apparent hands or feet. Trejo fainted, and his colleagues opened fire at the humanoid. Approximately 40 to 50 bullets were fired, but the being simply disappeared. While Trejo was being assisted, the same sound as before was heard. The next morning, 50 men searched the whole area but found no bullet casings or bullet holes. However, the Air Force concluded that the soldiers did fire their guns. Spanish Army veteran Vicente Juan believes the soldiers suffered nothing but a hallucination strengthened by fear and confusion.

== 1979 ==
- The Manises UFO Incident took place on 11 November 1979, forcing a commercial flight to make an emergency landing at the Manises airport in Valencia, Spain.

== 1981 ==
- On 24 June 1981, Prudencio Muguruza took a photograph of a brilliant light above the abandoned church tower in Ochate.

== 1994 ==
- On 18 January, a Tunguska-like event occurred at Cando in Galicia, Spain.

== See also ==
- List of reported UFO sightings
- UFO sightings in the Canary Islands
