= Mytilini Strait =

Strait in the Aegean Sea

Coordinates: 39.2°N 26.6°E

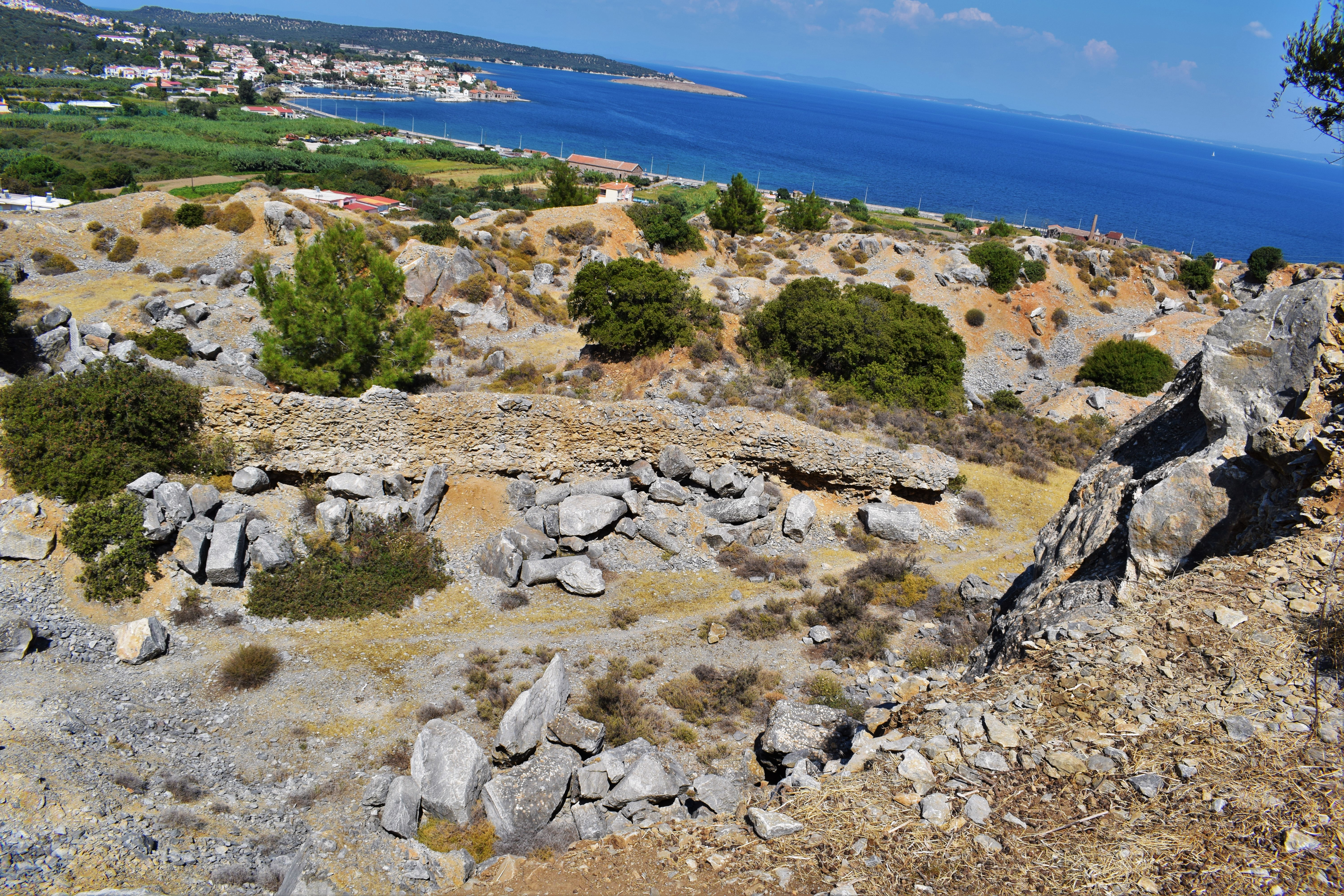
As seen from Lesbos, Panagiouda coast

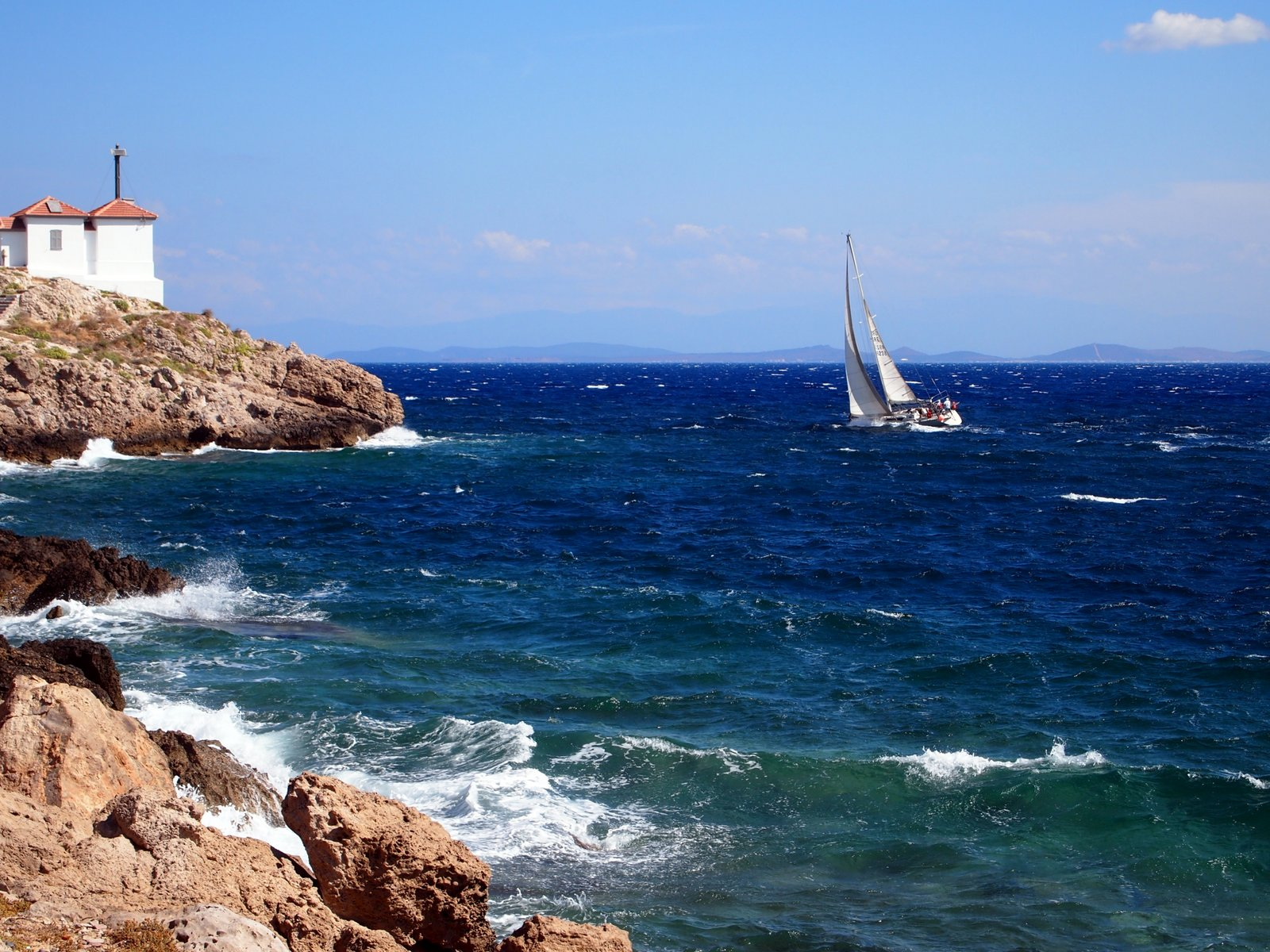
Coast in Mytilene

The Mytilini Strait (Greek: Στενό της Μυτιλήνης; Turkish: Midilli Boğazı) is a strait in the Aegean Sea that separates the Greek island of Lesbos from Turkey.
