= Ouzo Plomari =

Ouzo Plomari (Greek: Ούζο Πλωμάρι) is the name of a Greek ouzo company on the island of Lesvos, Greece.

It was founded in 1894 by Isidoros Arvanitis, a native of Plomari. The company exports to more than 40 countries.

== Gallery ==
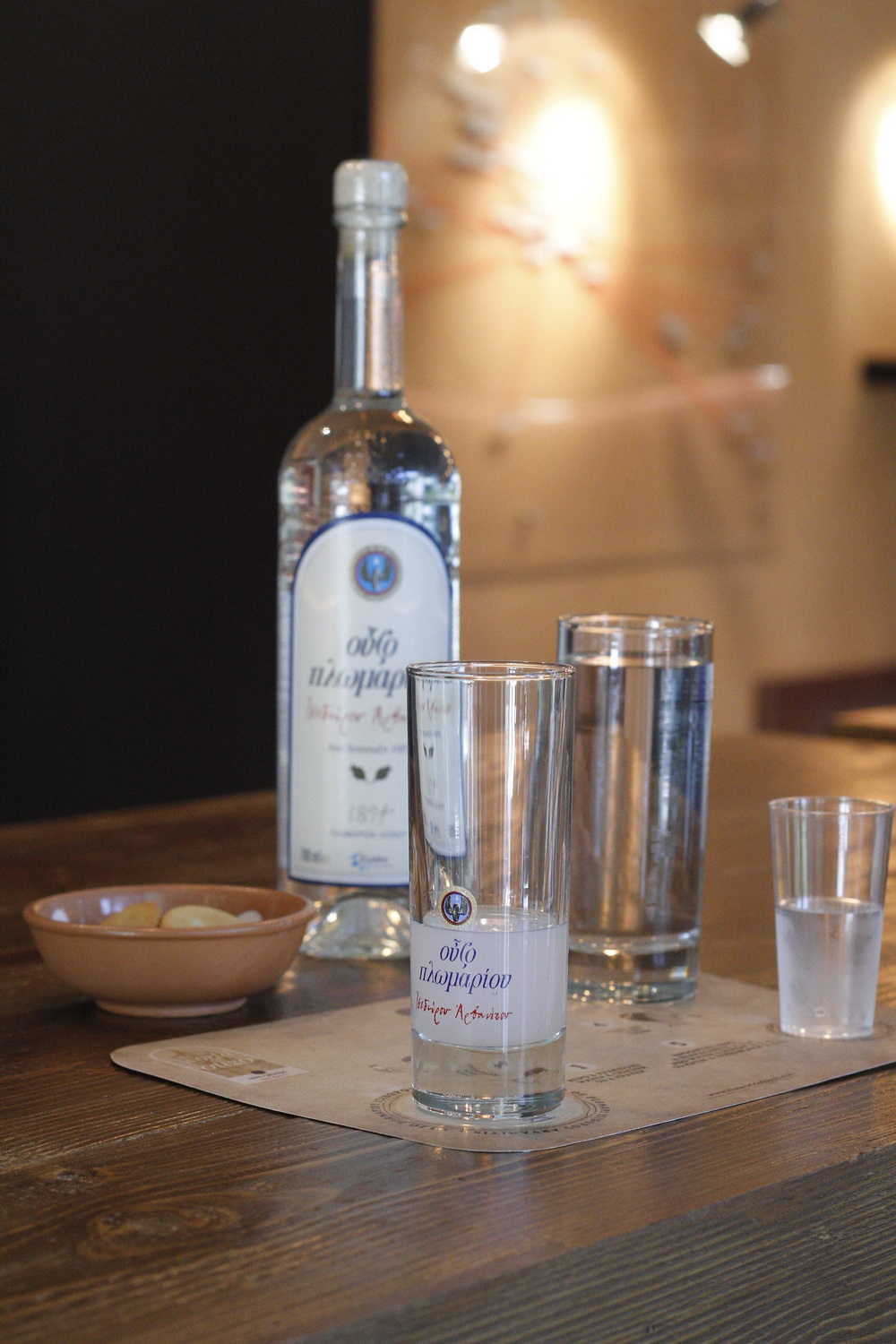
Bottle of Ouzo Plomari

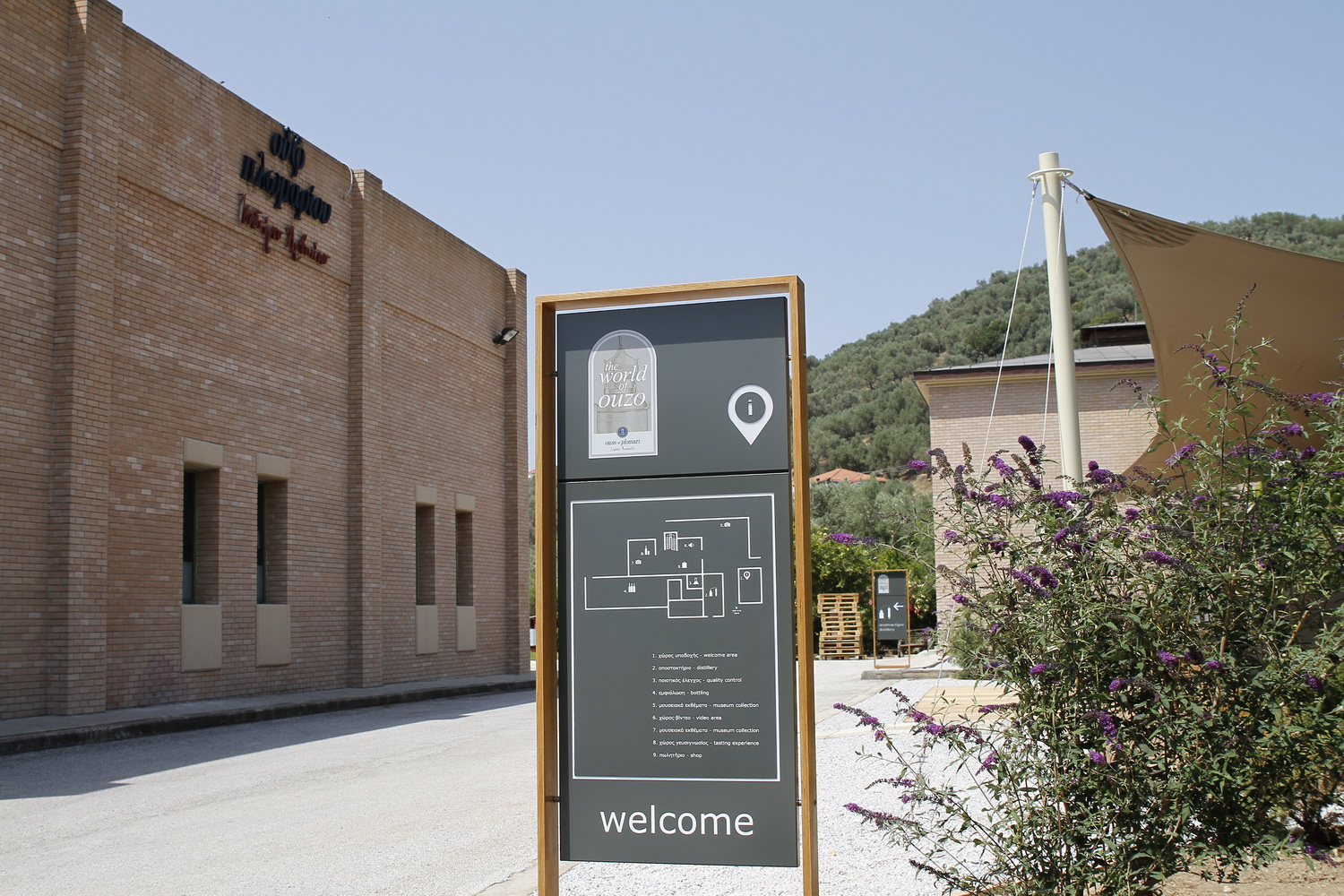
The World of Ouzo Museum in Plomari, the old industry facilities of the company
