= Agia Marina, Lesbos =

Agia Marina Αγία Μαρίνα
- Community
- Location within Greece
- Coordinates: 39°3′48″N 26°34′36″E
- Country: Greece
- Administrative region: North Aegean
- Regional unit: Lesbos
- Municipality: Mytilene
- Municipal unit: Mytilene

Population (2021)
  - Community: 709
- Time zone: UTC+2 (EET)
  - Summer (DST): UTC+3 (EEST)

Agia Marina (Greek: Αγία Μαρίνα) is a village on the island of Lesbos, North Aegean, Greece. Since the 2019 local government reform it is part of the municipality of Mytilene.
