= UFO sightings in Italy =

List of alleged UFO sightings within the nation of Italy

This is a list of alleged sightings of unidentified flying objects or UFOs in Italy.

== 100 BC ==
- A record from ancient Rome details reports of an alleged object above Tarquinia:

"When C. Murius and L. Valerius were consuls, in Tarquinia towards sunset, a round object, like a globe, a round or circular shield, took its path in the sky from west to east."

— Julius Obsequens

== 91 BC ==
- Another record from ancient Rome recounts a sighting on the island of Aenariae:

"At Aenariae, while Livius Troso was promulgating the laws at the beginning of the Italian war, at sunrise, there came a terrific noise in the sky, and a globe of fire appeared burning in the north. In the territory of Spoletum, a globe of fire, of golden colour, fell to the earth, gyrating. It then seemed to increase in size, rose from the earth and ascended into the sky, where it obscured the sun with its brilliance. It revolved toward the eastern quadrant of the sky."

— Julius Obsequens

== 43 BC ==
- Julius Obsequens wrote another account of an apparent aerial anomaly in ancient Rome: "something like a sort of weapon, or missile, rose with a great noise from the earth and soared into the sky."

== 1933 ==
- In 2000, Roberto Pinotti published material regarding the so-called "Fascist UFO Files", which dealt with a cigar-shaped object that had allegedly crashed near Milan in 1933 (some 14 years before the Roswell, New Mexico crash), and of the subsequent investigation by a never-before-mentioned Cabinet RS/33, that allegedly was authorized by Benito Mussolini, and headed by the Nobel scientist Guglielmo Marconi. The crashed vehicle was purportedly stored in the hangars of the SIAI-Marchetti in Vergiate near Milan.

== 1942 ==
- In March, a large object with four red lights was seen in Turin.

== 1950 ==
- A factory worker who was working near Varese claims to have seen several humanoids near a craft. When he fled, one of the entities shot him with an unknown beam which caused him to fall to the ground. Afterwards, the purported humanoids allegedly boarded their craft and ascended into the sky.

== 1954 ==
- A UFO sighting occurred above a football stadium in Florence on 27 October 1954, followed by a fall of angel hair. The UFO sighting was witnessed by ten thousand people who were attending a game. One witness said of a UFO that it was "something that looked like an egg that was moving slowly, slowly, slowly. Everyone was looking up and also there was some glitter coming down from the sky, silver glitter." Another witness described the UFOs as looking like Cuban cigars that "were moving very fast and then they just stopped. It all lasted a couple of minutes." Numerous other UFO sightings were observed across towns in Tuscany over the following days.
- Two UFOs were seen in the air above Taormina, Sicily. Images taken by photographer Giuseppe Grasso were published by United Press Newspictures on 30 November 1954.

== 1973 ==
- In 1973, an Alitalia airplane left Rome for Naples and sighted a mysterious round object. Two Italian Air Force planes from Ciampino confirmed the sighting. In the same year, there was another sighting at Caselle airport near Turin.

== 1978 ==
- Two young hikers, while walking on Monte Musinè near Turin, saw a bright light. One of them temporarily disappeared and, after a while, was found in a state of shock and with a noticeable scald on one leg. After regaining consciousness, he reported having seen an elongated vehicle, as well as some strangely shaped beings who allegedly descended from it. Both hikers suffered from conjunctivitis for some time thereafter.
- A close encounter was reported in September 1978 in Torrita di Siena in the Province of Siena. A young motorist witnessed a bright object in front of his vehicle, along with two beings of small stature who wore suits and helmets. The two approached the vehicle and, after observing it carefully, returned to the UFO and departed. A boy who lived with his family in a country house nearby said he had seen at the same time "a kind of small reddish sun".
- Also in 1978, the Zanfretta UFO Incident occurred, a well-known and controversial case of an alleged alien abduction. It was claimed by security guard Pier Fortunato Zanfretta that, on the nights of 6 and 7 December, he had been abducted while he was performing his job at Marzano, in the municipality of Torriglia in the Province of Genoa.

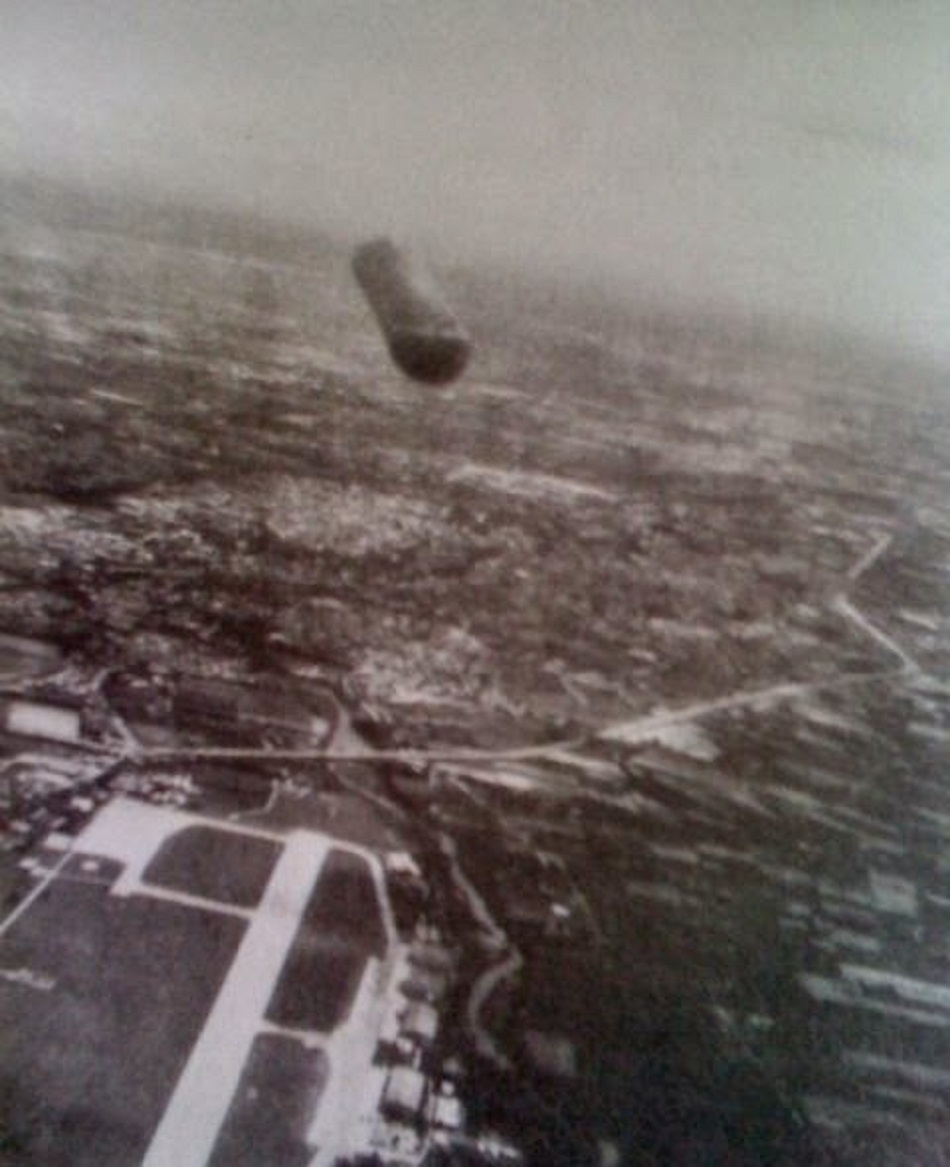
Taken in June 1979 by pilot Marshal Giancarlo Cecconi

== See also ==
- List of reported UFO sightings
