= Vrisa =

Vrisa Βρίσα
- Community
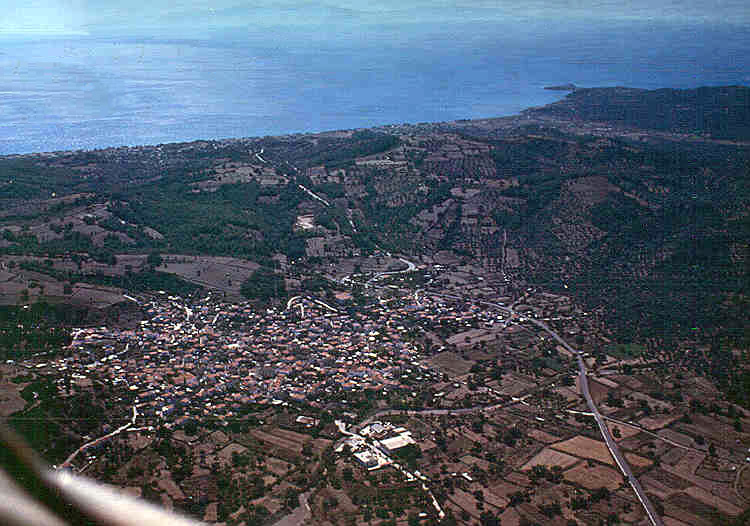
- Aerial view of Vrisa village in summer 1998

- Location within Greece
- Coordinates: 39°02′N 26°12′E
- Country: Greece
- Administrative region: North Aegean
- Regional unit: Lesbos
- Municipality: West Lesbos
- Municipal unit: Polichnitos

Population (2021)
  - Community: 660
- Time zone: UTC+2 (EET)
  - Summer (DST): UTC+3 (EEST)

Vrisa (Greek: Βρίσα) is a village in the southern part of Lesbos island approximately 50 km from Mytilene. The village is named after one of the two girls Agamemnon took from Lesbos during the ten-year Trojan War. Five kilometers south is the famous Vatera beach. On June 12, 2017 Vrisa was severely damaged in an earthquake that struck approximately 12 km South of the town of Plomari. Most people could not return to their homes, rendering the village effectively a "ghost village".

Four kilometres southwest is the Temple of Dionysos.

== Notable people ==
- Evangelos S. Gragoudas, MD. Professor of Ophthalmology, Harvard University. Dr. Gragoudas is an international authority in retinal diseases and intraocular tumors. He was born and raised in Vrisa.

== See also ==
- List of settlements in Lesbos
