= Panagiouda =

Panagiouda Παναγιούδα Λέσβου
- Community
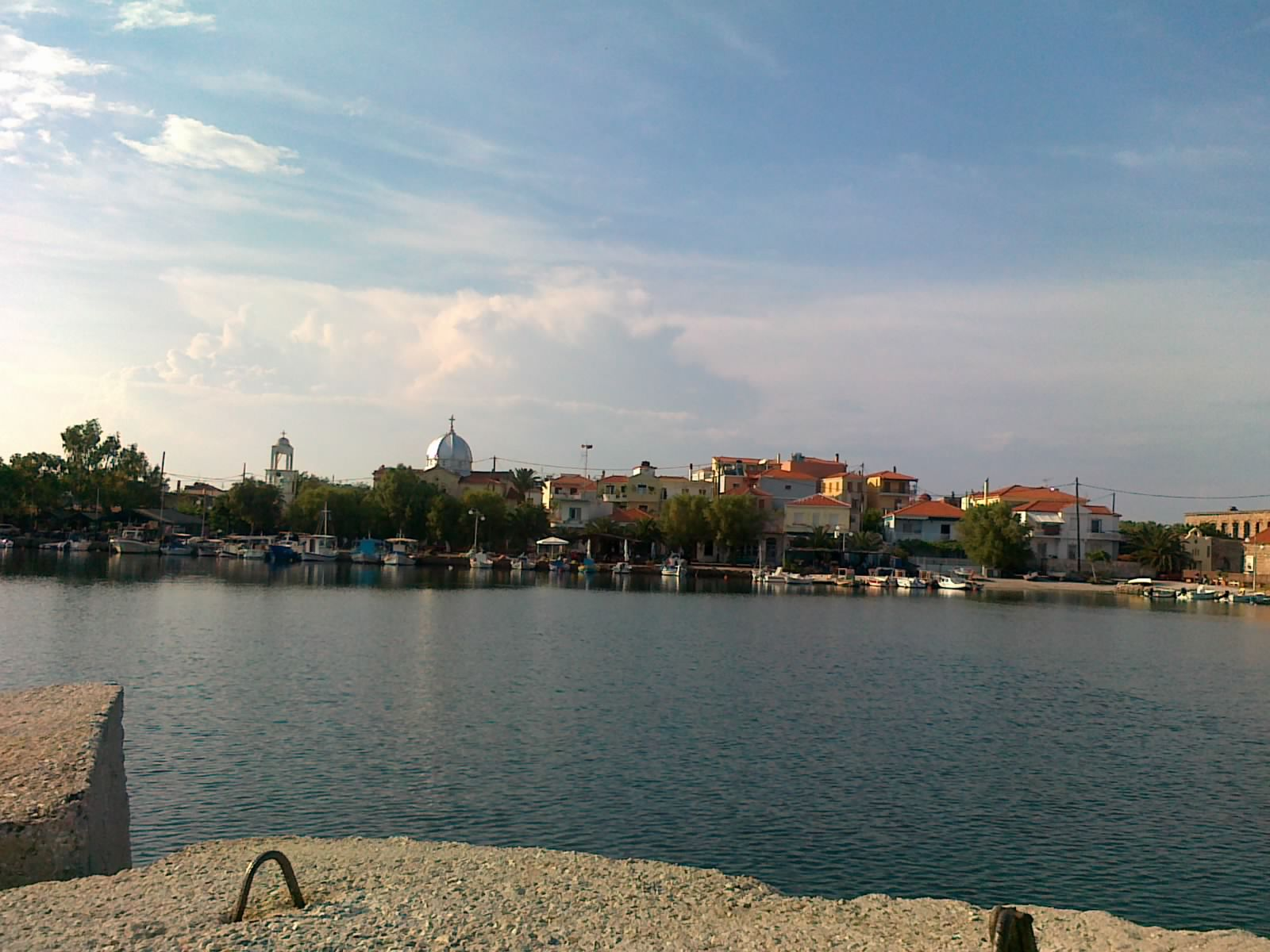
- Panagiouda, Mytilini Strait.

- Location within Greece
- Coordinates: 39.147°N 26.529°E
- Country: Greece
- Administrative region: North Aegean
- Regional unit: Lesbos
- Municipality: Mytilene
- Municipal unit: Mytilene

Population (2021)
  - Community: 982
- Time zone: UTC+2 (EET)
  - Summer (DST): UTC+3 (EEST)
- Postal code: 811 00
- Vehicle registration: MY

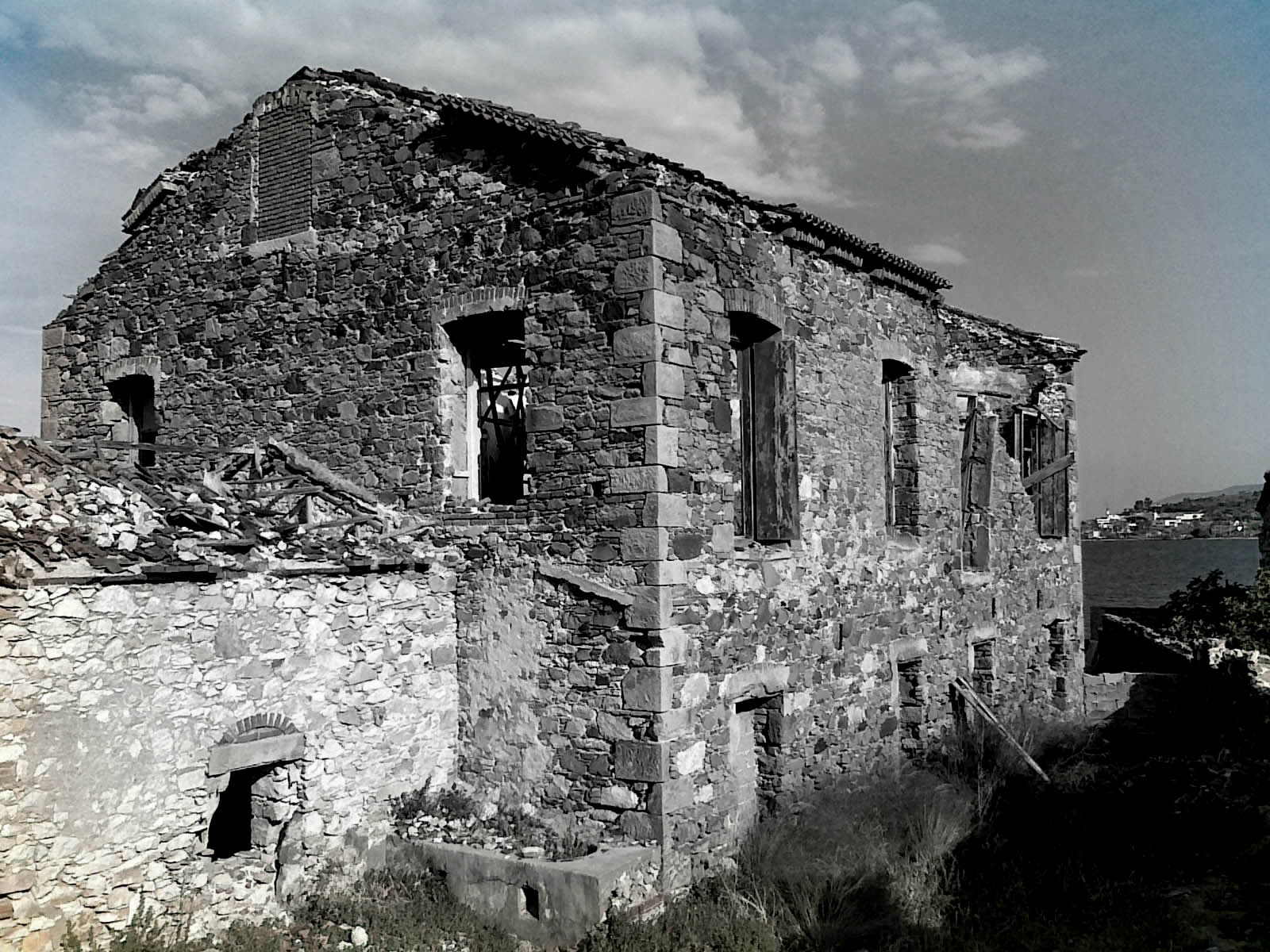
Ruins of an olive press or a soap press

Panagiouda (Greek: Παναγιούδα, Panagioúda) is a village on the east coast of Lesbos; 6 km (3.7 miles) north of Mytilene. As of 2011, Panagiouda had 906 inhabitants, primarily fishermen.

== History ==
The settlement was founded after an earthquake in 1867 forced many people from Afalonas to abandon their town and start anew. The first forty houses were constructed in 1874.

Kalamiaris, at the north of Panagiouda, is the birthplace of Odysseas Elytis. There is also the magnificent Panayoudha palm forest, which consists of Phoenix canariensis palms, and three flour tower houses of the early 20th century.

After the destruction of Minor Asia in 1924, 100 people immigrated to Panagiouda.

== Etymology ==
The name of the village comes from the Holy Virgin (Panayia) church there. It means "Small Holy Virgin". The church had been constructed by the great local architect Arghiris Adhalis in 1896 and is dedicated to the Holy Virgin's birthday.

== Travel ==
Mytilene National Airport is 12km (7.5 miles) from Panagiouda.
