= Agra, Kalloni =

Agra Άγρα
- Community
- Location within Greece
- Coordinates: 39°09′25″N 26°03′40″E
- Country: Greece
- Administrative region: North Aegean
- Regional unit: Lesbos
- Municipality: West Lesbos
- Municipal unit: Kalloni

Population (2021)
  - Community: 839
- Time zone: UTC+2 (EET)
  - Summer (DST): UTC+3 (EEST)
- Postal code: 811 xx
- Area code: 22530

Agra (Greek: Άγρα) is a village and a community on the island of Lesbos in Greece. Situated 10 kilometres from the Aegean Sea in the Kalloni municipal unit, the village is dominated by livestock-farming. The region's milk is predominantly used in the production of cheese, with feta and gruyere most-commonly made.

Agra is home to the church of Saint Dimitrios and the chapels of Saint Georgios and Taxiarchis, home to ecclesiastical utensils, books and renowned xylographic iconostases. The community Agra includes the small port village Apothikes.
