= UFO sightings in the Canary Islands =

UFO sightings in the Spanish region of the Canary Islands

This is a list of alleged sightings of unidentified flying objects or UFOs in the Canary Islands.

== 1970s ==
- A mass UFO sighting occurred over the Canary Islands on 22 June 1976. It is notable not only for its duration, which was in excess of 40 minutes, but also for the fact that it was witnessed by several hundred people across Tenerife, La Palma, La Gomera, Gran Canaria, and even at sea. The witnesses comprised both civilians and military personnel. Two witnesses claimed to have seen occupants within a craft; however, the interviewing military judge who wrote the Spanish government report and the then-lieutenant general of the Air Force who appointed him questioned this claim. The official report on the incident, which was written by the Spanish Air Force, was declassified in June 1994. Much of its content had already been released to the public in 1977, after journalist and paranormal investigator J. J. Benítez obtained the same report and used it as the basis for a book on UFO cases.

== See also ==
- UFO sightings in Spain
- List of reported UFO sightings
