= Palaiochori, Lesbos =

Palaiochori Παλαιοχώρι
- Community
- Panorama view of Palaiochori.

- Location within Greece
- Coordinates: 39°0′N 26°19′E
- Country: Greece
- Administrative region: North Aegean
- Regional unit: Lesbos
- Municipality: Mytilene
- Municipal unit: Plomari

Population (2021)
  - Community: 365
- Time zone: UTC+2 (EET)
  - Summer (DST): UTC+3 (EEST)

Palaiochori (Greek: Παλαιοχώρι, old form Palaiochorion, Παλαιοχώριον) is a village on the island of Lesbos, North Aegean, Greece. It is situated on a mountainside 12 km NW from the town of Plomari. The church of the village was built in 1864 and is dedicated to the Annunciation of the Virgin Mary. The beach of Melinda is located 3 km south of the village.
