= Skalochori =

Skalochori Σκαλοχώρι
- Community
- Location within Greece
- Coordinates: 40°22.4723′N 21°14.2247′E
- Country: Greece
- Administrative region: Western Macedonia
- Regional unit: Kozani
- Municipality: Voio
- Municipal unit: Neapoli
- Elevation: 870 m (2,850 ft)

Population (2021)
  - Community: 50
- Time zone: UTC+2 (EET)
  - Summer (DST): UTC+3 (EEST)
- Postal code: 522 00
- Area code: +30-2468
- Vehicle registration: ΚΖ

Skalochori (Greek: Σκαλοχώρι) is a village and a community of the Voio municipality. Before the 2011 local government reform it was part of the municipality of Neapoli, of which it was a municipal district. The 2021 census recorded 50 inhabitants in the village.
