= Anemotia =

Anemotia Ανεμότια
- Community
- Location within Greece
- Coordinates: 39°15′N 26°06′E
- Country: Greece
- Administrative region: North Aegean
- Regional unit: Lesbos
- Municipality: West Lesbos
- Municipal unit: Kalloni

Population (2021)
  - Community: 338
- Time zone: UTC+2 (EET)
  - Summer (DST): UTC+3 (EEST)

Anemotia is a village on the Greek island of Lesbos. It belongs to the municipal unit of Kalloni and is in the mountains, roughly halfway between Kalloni and Eresos.

Anemotia's cobbled streets, stone houses and panoramic vistas make it picturesque. The fertile but rocky terrain of the mountains is covered with olive trees. The local farmers claim that the olives grown on these trees produce the most fragrant olive oil in the country.
