= Plomari =

Greek town in Lesbos

Plomari Πλωμάρι
- Municipal unit
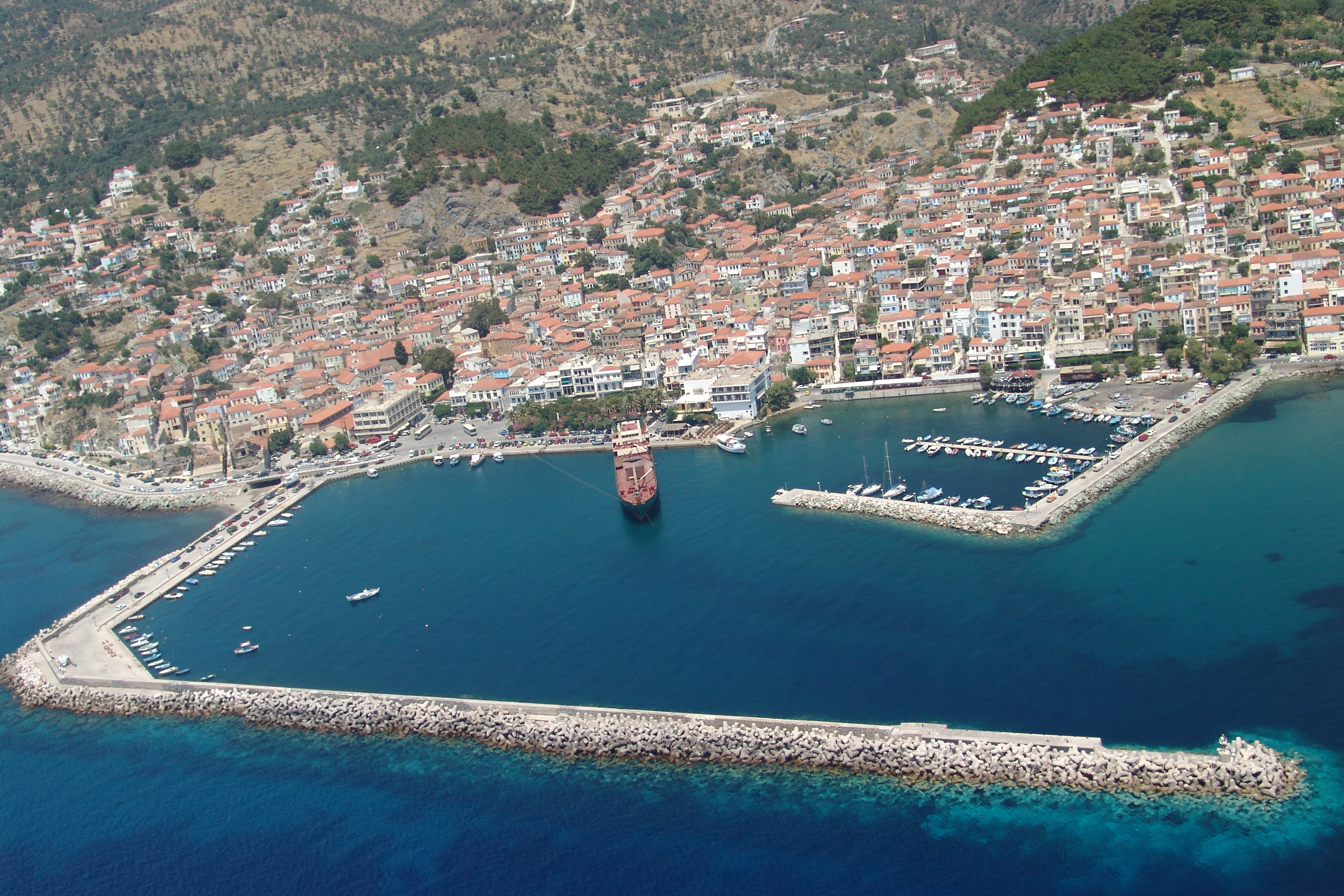
- Aerial view of Plomari.

- Location within the regional unit

- Location within Greece
- Coordinates: 38°59′N 26°22′E
- Country: Greece
- Administrative region: North Aegean
- Regional unit: Lesbos
- Municipality: Mytilene

Area
  - Municipal unit: 122.5 km^{2} (47.3 sq mi)

Population (2021)
  - Municipal unit: 4,852
  - Municipal unit density: 39.61/km^{2} (102.6/sq mi)
  - Community: 2,930
- Time zone: UTC+2 (EET)
  - Summer (DST): UTC+3 (EEST)
- Vehicle registration: MY

Plomari (Greek: Πλωμάρι) is a town and a former municipality on the island of Lesbos, North Aegean, Greece. Since the 2019 local government reform it is part of the municipality Mytilene, of which it is a municipal unit. It is the only sizable coastal settlement in the south, and the second largest town on Lesbos. The municipal unit of Plomari is the southernmost on Lesbos Island and has a land area of 122.452 km^{2} and a 2021 census population of 4,852. Its largest towns or villages are Plomári, the former municipal seat, Plagiá, Palaiochóri, Megalochóri, and Akrási.

== Description ==
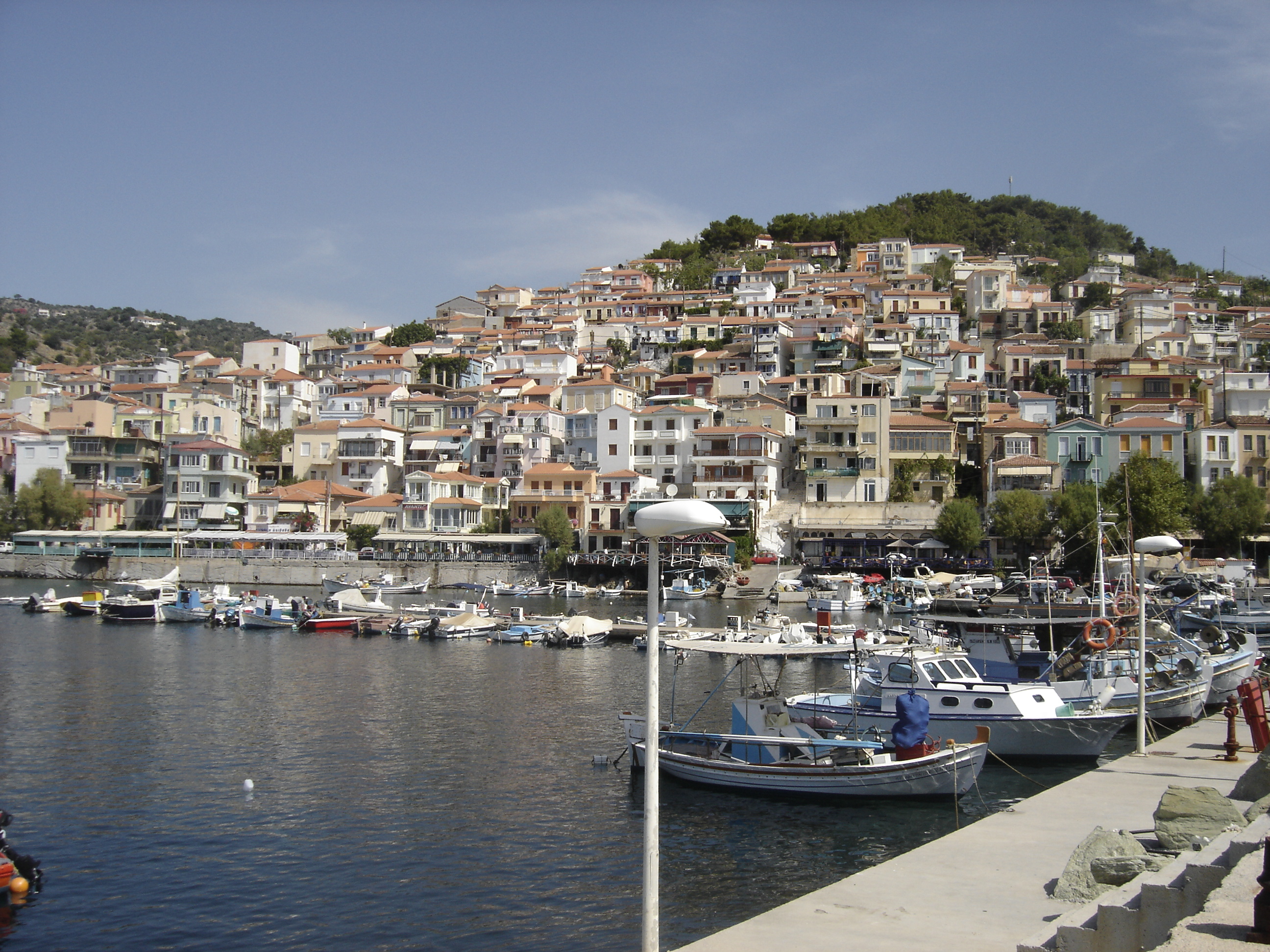
View of the port.

Plomari is located south of Mount Olympos. It offers scenic appeal as well as the presence of its famous ouzo-distilling industry. Brands can be sampled at the traditional kafenia. The local festival (or "panigiri") season kicks off in mid-July with an ouzo festival, and culminates towards the end month in celebrations honouring Agios Haralambos and including such rural activities as horse races. The seaside summer resort of Agios Isidoros lies on the east, two kilometers far from Plomari, while the seaside neighbourhood Ammoudeli, with the church of Agios Panteleimonas, is located on the west.

== Province ==
The province of Plomari (Greek: Επαρχία Πλωμαρίου) was one of the provinces of the Lesbos Prefecture. Its territory corresponded with that of the current municipal unit Plomari and the village Stavros. It was abolished in 2006.

== Sport ==
There is a sports club based in Plomari called Egeas Plomariou (Greek: Αιγέας Πλωμαρίου) best known for its football team that currently plays in one of local football championships of Greece, lowest leagues of Greek football, and was founded in 1949. It has a basketball team too.

== Landmarks ==
- Polikentro
- Ouzo Museum: The World of Ouzo (Ouzo Plomari Isidoros Arvanitis industry)
- Ouzo Museum (Varvagianni)
- Soap museum

== People ==
- Veniamin Lesvios, scholar
