= Kalloni =

Kalloni Καλλονή
- Municipal unit
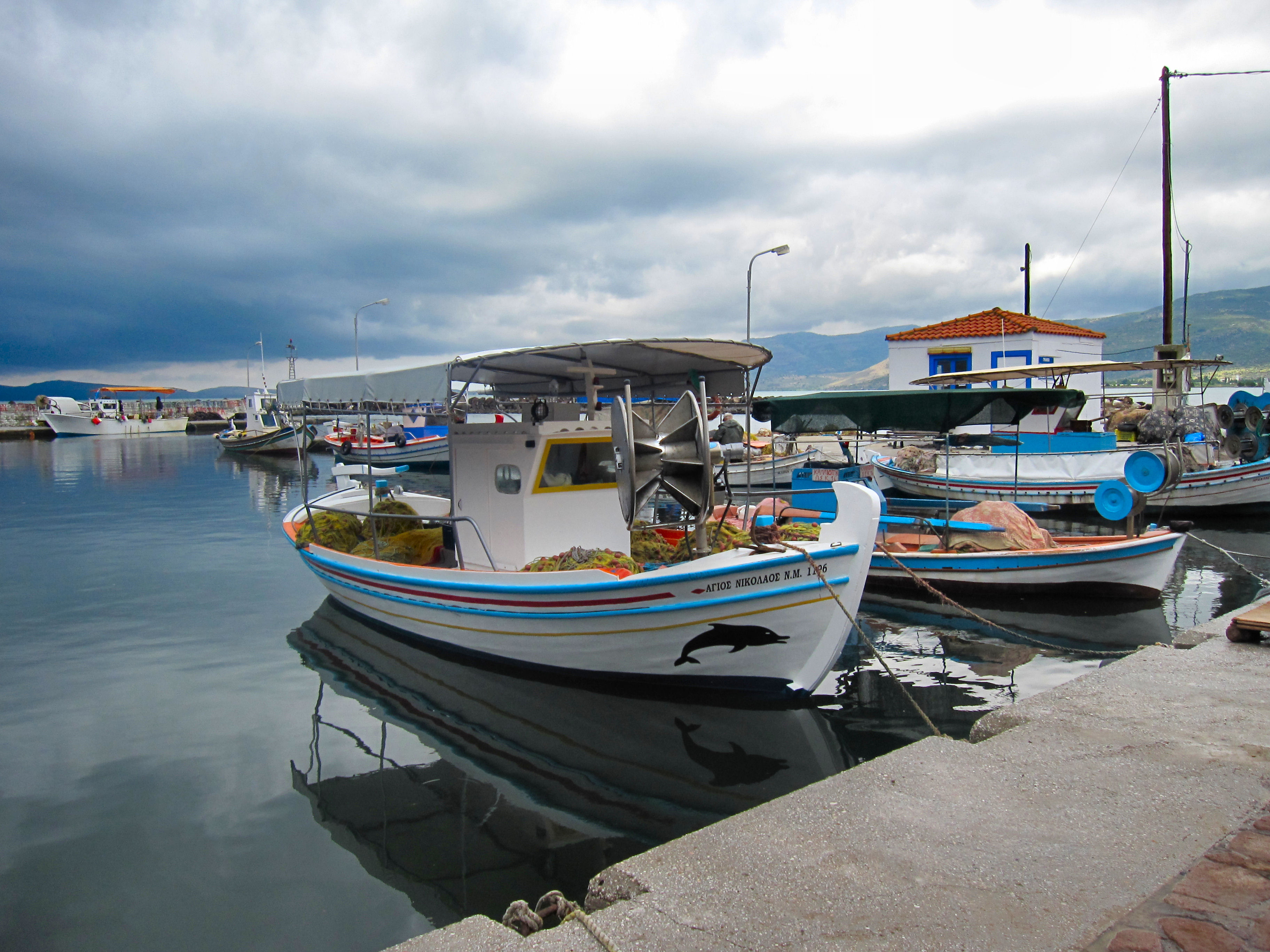
- View of the harbour in Skala Kallonis

- Location within the regional unit

- Location within Greece
- Coordinates: 39°14′N 26°15′E
- Country: Greece
- Administrative region: North Aegean
- Regional unit: Lesbos
- Municipality: West Lesbos

Area
  - Municipal unit: 241.9 km^{2} (93.4 sq mi)
- Elevation: 20 m (66 ft)

Population (2021)
  - Municipal unit: 7,762
  - Municipal unit density: 32.09/km^{2} (83.11/sq mi)
  - Community: 2,161
- Time zone: UTC+2 (EET)
  - Summer (DST): UTC+3 (EEST)
- Postal code: 81107
- Area code: 22530
- Vehicle registration: MY
- Website: www.kallonh.gr

Kalloni (Greek: Καλλονή) is a town in the west-central part of the island of Lesbos, Greece. It is the seat of the West Lesbos municipality and the Kalloni municipal unit within it. Prior to 2011 the current municipal unit was a municipality. The name also existed in ancient times, though the conventional transcription of the classical name in English is "Callone".

It has a land area of 241.946 km². At the 2021 census it had a population of 7,762 inhabitants. The municipal seat was the town of Kalloní. The unit's largest other towns are Agra, Parákoila, Dáfia, Fília, Skalochóri, Anemotia, and Kerámi. Kalloni was known as Kalonya during Ottoman rule, when it was a nahiya (township) center in the Molova kaza of the Midilli sanjak. Lesbos became part of the Kingdom of Greece in 1912.

== Description ==
Kalloni is surrounded by the gulf waters, and supplied by a plain of 100 km², through which six rivers flow. There is always enough water from the underground and spring waters for its vineyards and gardens.

Kalloni was historically the crossroad where the main roads passed. This has not changed much from ancient times. The village is surrounded by historic monasteries.

In the last decade, the central village of Kalloni developed in the field of trade. Kalloni was the seat of the municipality that comprised the settlements:

- Agra
- Anemotia
- Arisvi
- Dafia
- Filia
- Kalloni
- Kerami
- Parakoila
- Skalochori

== Festivals ==
The summer festivals present a special interest. The festival of sardines in Skala Kalloni in July, where freshly grilled sardines are offered to the visitors with plenty of ouzo accompanied with live traditional music and dance shows. On 16 August a festival takes place in the main square of Kalloni in order to honor émigrés. The livestock breeding in Agra, the wine festival in Anemotia as well as the panigyri of Saint Trinity on 7 July in Kalloni, which includes three days of feasting and horse races.

== Historical sites ==
There are significant archaeological sites on the plain. The ancient Lesbians worshiped many of the ancient gods in great sanctuaries, parts of which are preserved today. The temple of Messa was dedicated to Zeus, Dionysus and Ira, constituted a worship and communication centre for all the Lesbians, and at the beginning of the 2nd century B.C. was the seat of the federation of all the cities of Lesbos. During the early Christian period a basilica was erected over the temple, which was succeeded by a mid-Byzantine church. There are many remains, ruins, altars and ancient remnants around the region, signs of worship of the Lesbian people who arrived there as pilgrims to the great sanctuary of Pyrra and of the entire island. Important archaeological sites are also found in Apothika, between Parakila and Agra, where the ancient retaining wall of about six meters height is located, but also in Makara, bearing the name of the first settler of Lesbos during ancient times.

== Bay and lagoon ==
The lagoon of ancient Pyrrha is now the Gulf of Kalloni or Bay of Kalloni. The ancient city of Pyrrha is currently Achladeri Lesvos, which sits to the east of the Bay of Kalloni. The Gulf of Kalloni is a shallow, rich wetland that hosts aquatic and avian life, including flamingos, porpoises, dolphins, and seals. It is especially renowned for its yield of sardines. Following his departure from Plato's Academy after being passed over for the school's headship, Aristotle spent a few years with his friend Theophrastus at the Pyrrha lagoon, now the Gulf of Kalloni. There he studied animal life: his observations formed material for the very first treatises ever written on the subject of biology or Aristotle's biology, namely his books on the "history, parts, movement, progression, and generation" of animals.

== Media ==
In Kalloni Lesvos there are two Radio Stations:

Frequency	Name	On air since	Description
96.8 MHz	Minore 96.8 FM	1985	Greek music, Pop, Dance and Rock
107.7 MHz	Radio Kalloni	1996	News, talk and Greek music
