= List of shipwrecks in 1928 =

The list of shipwrecks in 1928 includes ships sunk, foundered, grounded, or otherwise lost during 1928.

table of contents
1928
Jan	Feb	Mar	Apr
May	Jun	Jul	Aug
Sep	Oct	Nov	Dec
Unknown date

== January ==
=== 1 January ===
List of shipwrecks: 1 January 1928
Ship	State	Description
Jennie	United Kingdom	The coaster sprang a leak off Cobh, County Cork, Ireland and was beached. She was refloated later that day and proceeded to Cobh for examination.
Prima	Germany	The cargo ship ran aground the Outer Carr Rocks, Newbiggin-by-the-Sea, Northumberland, United Kingdom. Her crew were rescued.

=== 2 January ===
List of shipwrecks: 2 January 1928
Ship	State	Description
Amerique	France	The cargo ship ran aground at Pointe Camoes, Belgian Congo. She was refloated on 12 January.

=== 5 January ===
List of shipwrecks: 5 January 1928
Ship	State	Description
Eastern Shore	United States	The cargo ship was destroyed by fire at Baltimore, Ohio.
Mineola	United States	The cargo ship was driven ashore on Old Providence Island, Colombia. She was refloated on 16 January.
North Bend	United States	The schooner ran aground at the mouth of the Columbia River, Oregon and was a total loss.
Santiago	Spain	The cargo ship sprang a leak and foundered in the Aegean Sea north west of the Megalonisi Lighthouse, Greece, Her crew were rescued.

=== 6 January ===
List of shipwrecks: 6 January 1928
Ship	State	Description
Noble	United Kingdom	The motor schooner ran aground at Estevan, Saskatchewan, Canada and was wrecked with the loss of four crew.

=== 7 January ===
List of shipwrecks: 7 January 1928
Ship	State	Description
Topsy D	United States	During a voyage in the Territory of Alaska from Wrangell to Louise Cove, the 9-gross register ton, 33-foot (10 m) fishing vessel was wrecked on rocks at Point Amelius (56°12′00″N 133°54′15″W) during a gale. Both people on board survived.

=== 9 January ===
List of shipwrecks: 9 January 1928
Ship	State	Description
Nicholas Norbert	France	The cargo ship ran aground west of Calais, Pas-de-Calais, France. She broke in two and was a total loss. Her crew were rescued.
Vang	Norway	The cargo ship ran aground in the Nieuwediep, the Netherlands. Her crew were rescued. She was refloated on 11 January.

=== 10 January ===
List of shipwrecks: 10 January 1928
Ship	State	Description
Kerry Head	United Kingdom	The cargo ship ran aground on Cullen Island, Clew Bay, County Mayo, Ireland. She was refloated on 21 January.

=== 11 January ===
List of shipwrecks: 11 January 1928
Ship	State	Description
Barrgrove	United Kingdom	The cargo ship ran aground at Norfolk, Virginia, United States. She was refloated on 16 January.
Tosei Maru	Japan	The coaster came ashore at Shiribesi and was a total loss.

=== 12 January ===
List of shipwrecks: 12 January 1928
Ship	State	Description
Rita Larsen	Germany	The cargo ship sprang a leak and foundered off the Torbjoernskjaer Lighthouse. All crew were rescued.
Roi Leopold	Belgium	The cargo ship was wrecked off Cape São Thomé, Brazil.
Waka Maru	Japan	The cargo ship ran aground at Yura, Wakayama. She was refloated on 16 January.

=== 13 January ===
List of shipwrecks: 13 January 1928
Ship	State	Description
Abando	Spain	The cargo ship sprang a leak in the Fos Gulf and was beached. She was refloated on 16 January.
Sunny Point	United States	The 26-gross register ton, 47.2-foot (14.4 m) fishing vessel was destroyed off Peninsula Point (55°23′N 131°44′W) in Southeast Alaska near Ward Cove, Territory of Alaska, by a fire that began when her gasoline engine backfired and caused an explosion. The only person aboard survived.

=== 14 January ===
List of shipwrecks: 14 January 1928
Ship	State	Description
Cadore	Italy	The cargo ship sank in the Atlantic Ocean off Farilhões, Portugal. Hew crew were rescued.

=== 15 January ===
List of shipwrecks: 15 January 1928
Ship	State	Description
Cartagena	Brazil	The 125.7-foot (38.3 m), 271-ton steam trawler, a sold off Castle-class naval trawler, sank in the Irish Sea (53°25′N 04°04′W) just after leaving Lune Deep for Rio de Janeiro in a storm from unknown causes. Lost with all 12 hands. The wreck was located November 1929. Positively identified by divers on 23 October 1989.
Excelsior	United Kingdom	The Thames barge sank in the North Sea off the Nore Lightship (United Kingdom) with the loss of two crew.
Hilda	United States	The ferry was sunk in a collision with barges in the Mississippi River off Norco, Louisiana. Seven passengers drowned.

=== 17 January ===
List of shipwrecks: 17 January 1928
Ship	State	Description
Montgomery City	United States	The cargo ship ran aground at Charleston, Virginia. She was refloated on 24 January.

=== 18 January ===
List of shipwrecks: 18 January 1928
Ship	State	Description
Joffre	Portugal	The sailing ship was dismasted in the Atlantic Ocean (15°24′N 25°40′W). All 25 people on board were rescued by Augusta (Italy) and she was abandoned.

=== 21 January ===
List of shipwrecks: 21 January 1928
Ship	State	Description
Albatros	Germany	The salvage vessel foundered in the North Sea with the loss of all hands.
Sagua la Grande	United Kingdom	The coaster departed Philadelphia, Pennsylvania, United States for Halifax, Nova Scotia, Canada. No further trace, presumed foundered with the loss of all hands.

=== 24 January ===
List of shipwrecks: 24 January 1928
Ship	State	Description
Alto Paraná	Argentina	The cargo ship sank off Romanso Castillo. All crew survived.
Loch Leven	United Kingdom	The coaster ran aground at Aberffraw, Anglesey. All seven crew were rescued.

=== 25 January ===
List of shipwrecks: 25 January 1928
Ship	State	Description
Teane	United Kingdom	The coaster departed Swansea, Glamorgan for Porto, Portugal. No further trace, presumed foundered with the loss of all hands.

=== 26 January ===
List of shipwrecks: 26 January 1928
Ship	State	Description
Belmont	United Kingdom	The 117.5-foot (35.8 m), 209-ton steam trawler was wrecked on Horseback Rocks, Peterhead. Scrapped in place.

=== 27 January ===
List of shipwrecks: 27 January 1928
Ship	State	Description
Jennie	United Kingdom	The coaster sank in the River Mersey at Liverpool, Lancashire. She was refloated on 30 January and beached at Tranmere, Cheshire.

=== 28 January ===
List of shipwrecks: 28 January 1928
Ship	State	Description
Aransas	United States	The barge sank in a gale off Barnegat, New Jersey after losing her tow vessel. Lost with all three hands.
Catonsville	United States	The barge sank in a gale off Barnegat, New Jersey after losing her tow vessel. Lost with all three hands.
Grong	Norway	The cargo ship collided with Roumeli (Turkey) in the Dardanelles and was beached at Dohan Aslan, Turkey.

=== 30 January ===
List of shipwrecks: 30 January 1928
Ship	State	Description
Mayotte	United Kingdom	The schooner was abandoned in the Atlantic Ocean off Bermuda. Her crew were rescued by Canadian Pathfinder (United Kingdom).

=== 31 January ===
List of shipwrecks: 31 January 1928
Ship	State	Description
Chickasaw	United States	The Design 1022 cargo ship ran aground in Boston Harbor, Massachusetts. She was refloated on 5 February.
Devon City	United Kingdom	The cargo ship ran aground at Muroran, Hokkaidō, Japan. She was refloated on 6 February.
Ocean Transport	United Kingdom	The cargo ship was driven ashore on Ocean Island. She was declared a total loss on 13 December.

=== Unknown date ===
List of shipwrecks: Unknown January 1928
Ship	State	Description
Caliph	United Kingdom	The 120.5-foot (36.7 m), 226-ton trawler went aground at Helvick Head, near Dungarvan, County Waterford, Ireland, sometime in January. Refloated on 27 January, arriving at Cork for repairs the next day.

== February ==
=== 1 February ===
List of shipwrecks: 1 February 1928
Ship	State	Description
Edmund	United Kingdom	The Thames barge sank 3 nautical miles (5.6 km) off Southend Pier, Essex.
Flottbek	Germany	The cargo ship ran aground at Cape Arkona, Rügen, Mecklenburg-Vorpommern. She was refloated on 12 February.

=== 3 February ===
List of shipwrecks: 3 February 1928
Ship	State	Description
Sendeja	Spain	The cargo ship ran aground at Santander, Cantabria and was a total loss.

=== 7 February ===
List of shipwrecks: 7 February 1928
Ship	State	Description
Yungay	Chile	The cargo ship was wrecked at Nassau, Bahamas. Her crew were rescued.

=== 9 February ===
List of shipwrecks: 9 February 1928
Ship	State	Description
Santa Colomba	Italy	The schooner foundered in a storm off Ischia. All eight crew were rescued by Koningin Elisabeth (Belgium).
Maria Teresa	Italy	The cargo ship ran aground at Scholpin, Pomerania, Germany. She was refloated on 15 February.

=== 11 February ===
List of shipwrecks: 11 February 1928
Ship	State	Description
Lord Hartington	United Kingdom	The Thames barge collided with Noorderdijk (Netherlands in the Scheldt at Kruisschans, Antwerp, Belgium and sank. Both crew were rescued.
Taormina	Norway	The cargo ship ran aground at Padstow, Cornwall, United Kingdom. All eighteen crew were rescued. She was refloated on 20 February.

=== 13 February ===
List of shipwrecks: 13 February 1928
Ship	State	Description
Agnes Clover	United Kingdom	The schooner was driven ashore at Rhos-on-Sea, Denbighshire, Wales, and was a total loss.
Briarlyn	United Kingdom	The 125-foot (38 m), 276-ton steam trawler, a sold off Castle-class naval trawler, was wrecked in the night at Northbay, Hirta, Soay, Scotland in heavy weather. Four crew who had abandoned ship in her dingy were rescued by trawler "Cuirass" (United Kingdom). By daylight the next morning the ship had sunk and the 8 on board were lost.
USS Mohave	United States Navy	The 122-foot (37 m), 575-displacement ton tug struck the east side of Hardings Ledge – a submerged reef in Outer Boston Harbor off the coast of Massachusetts – and sank without loss of life in 10 to 25 feet (3.0 to 7.6 m) of water.

=== 14 February ===
List of shipwrecks: 14 February 1928
Ship	State	Description
Burnside	United Kingdom	The cargo ship was abandoned in the Atlantic Ocean 80 nautical miles (150 km) south south east of Land's End, Cornwall. Her crew were rescued by Iroise (France).
Orlock Head	United Kingdom	The cargo ship ran aground at Irvine, Ayrshire. She was later refloated and arrived at Belfast, County Antrim on 28 February for examination.

=== 15 February ===
List of shipwrecks: 15 February 1928
Ship	State	Description
Briarlyn	United Kingdom	The sold off Castle class trawler struck a ledge and started to fill in Soay Bay in a gale with heavy seas. She was beached in North Bay, Hirta, St. Kilda. Four men abandoned ship in a boat and were rescued by "Cuirass" (United Kingdom). She was sunk by first light and the remaining 8 crew were lost.
Chuky	United States	The tanker broke in two after an explosion and sank 200 miles (320 km) off Yokohama, Japan. 15 crewmen killed, including her master and three mates. 21 crewmen abandoned ship in a lifeboat and were rescued by a Japanese fishing vessel.
Los Angeles	Germany	The cargo ship was severely damaged by fire whilst under construction at Hamburg.
Lozere	France	The whaler ran aground in Cauvreus Bay, Kerguelen Islands and was abandoned by her crew.

=== 16 February ===
List of shipwrecks: 16 February 1928
Ship	State	Description
Fort de Troyon	France	The cargo ship ran aground at Hook of Holland, Netherlands. She was refloated on 23 February.

=== 17 February ===
List of shipwrecks: 17 February 1928
Ship	State	Description
Arna	Czechoslovakia	The cargo ship sank in the Mediterranean Sea off Cape Gata, Spain.
Chuky	United States	The tanker exploded and sank in the Pacific Ocean (approximately 33°N 140°E).

=== 18 February ===
List of shipwrecks: 18 February 1928
Ship	State	Description
Barøy	Norway	The cargo ship ran aground at Andenes, Norway. She was refloated but subsequently sank.
Grenna	Sweden	The cargo ship ran aground at the Tvistein Lighthouse and was wrecked with the loss of two crew.
Shonga	United Kingdom	The cargo ship was driven ashore at IJmuiden, Netherlands. She broke in two and was a total loss. All 41 people on board were rescued by the IJmuiden, Nieuwediep and Wijk-aan-Zee lifeboats.
Varand	United Kingdom	The tanker, on her maiden voyage, ran aground in Liverpool Bay and was abandoned by her crew. She was either refloated the next day, or on 20 February.

=== 19 February ===
List of shipwrecks: 19 February 1928
Ship	State	Description
Alaska	United States	The 67-gross register ton motor halibut schooner was wrecked on a reef off the south end of the Territory of Alaska's Kodiak Island between Kaguyak (56.869°N 153.796°W) and the Geese Islands (56°45′N 153°45′W). Her crew of 10 survived, but she became a total loss.
Los Santos	Panama	The cargo ship collided with Cocle (Panama at Panama City and sank with the loss of two crew.
Sterna	Denmark	The cargo ship sprang a leak in the Baltic Sea and was beached south of Pillau, Prussia, Germany. Her crew were rescued.

=== 20 February ===
List of shipwrecks: 20 February 1928
Ship	State	Description
Foreland	United Kingdom	The collier ran aground on the north of Guernsey Channel Islands. She capsized and sank.
George W. Truitt Jr.	United States	The schooner was driven ashore at Norfolk, Virginia and was wrecked.
Harbour Light	United Kingdom	The tug capsized and sank in the River Thames at the entrance to Regent's Canal with the loss of all three crew.
Obligance	France	The tug capsized and sank at Rouen, Seine Maritime whilst assisting Aragaz (France). Two of her crew were lost.
Norge	Norway	The passenger ship ran aground and sank at Haugesund, Norway with the loss of eleven lives.

=== 21 February ===
List of shipwrecks: 21 February 1928
Ship	State	Description
C. A. Larsen	Norway	The whale oil refining ship ran aground in the Paterson Inlet, New Zealand. She was refloated in mid-April, arriving at Port Chalmers on 13 April.
Rodoni	Italy	The cargo ship sprang a leak in the Mediterranean Sea off Sallum and was beached at Sidi Barrani.

=== 23 February ===
List of shipwrecks: 23 February 1928
Ship	State	Description
Dunmore	United Kingdom	The cargo ship collided with Alsacien (France) in the River Thames downstream of Gravesend, Kent with the loss of a crew member. She was beached at Mucking, Essex. Dunmore was refloated on 26 February.
General Church	United Kingdom	The cargo ship ran aground at Cephalonia, Greece. She was refloated on 26 February.
Sao Salvador	Brazil	The cargo ship was holed and consequently beached at Assacayo.
Thraki	Greece	The cargo ship ran aground at Brăila, Romania. She was refloated on 27 February.

=== 24 February ===
List of shipwrecks: 24 February 1928
Ship	State	Description
Alcantara	Spain	The cargo ship collided with the sail training barque Tovarish (Soviet Union) in the English Channel off Dungeness, Kent, United Kingdom and sank with the loss of all but one of her crew. The survivor was rescued by Moldavia (United Kingdom).
Alice Williams	United Kingdom	The schooner ran aground on Skokholm Island, Pembrokeshire. She later broke up and was a total loss.
Lombardo	Italy	The cargo ship was driven ashore at Derna, Libya and was a total loss. Her crew were rescued.
Paris	United Kingdom	The cargo ship sprang a leak at Le Havre, Seine Maritime, France and was beached. She was refloated later that day and towed into Le Havre.
Southern Queen	United Kingdom	The tanker struck an ice floe and foundered in the Antarctic Ocean off the South Orkney Islands. All crew were rescued.
Vincent	United Kingdom	The Thames barge collided with Alsacien (France) in the Thames Estuary and sank with the loss of one of the three people on board. Survivors were rescued by a tug.

=== 25 February ===
List of shipwrecks: 25 February 1928
Ship	State	Description
Gap	France	The cargo ship ran aground at Coverack, Cornwall, United Kingdom. She was abandoned on 27 February, and was declared a total loss on 23 March.
Georges Raymonde	France	The ship sprang a leak in the Atlantic Ocean (40°50′N 4°40′W) and was abandoned. Two crew were rescued by Theodore Roosevelt (Norway).
Hissar	Turkey	The cargo ship was driven ashore at Buyuk Tchekmejeh. She was refloated on 27 February.
Kashin Maru	Japan	The cargo ship struck the wreck of Nichinan Maru (Japan) at Kobe and sank. Her crew were rescued.

=== 26 February ===
List of shipwrecks: 26 February 1928
Ship	State	Description
Shoebury	United Kingdom	The Thames barge collided with Gaslight (United Kingdom) in the River Thames and sank. Her crew were rescued.

=== 29 February ===
List of shipwrecks: 29 February 1928
Ship	State	Description
Kinko Maru	Japan	The cargo ship ran aground off Foochow, China and was wrecked. Her crew were rescued by a destroyer.
Lilly	United States	The 10-gross register ton motor vessel was destroyed by fire in Badger Bay (55°08′38″N 130°49′00″W) in Southeast Alaska. Her hull was towed to shore and beached.
Orsolina	Italy	The cargo ship collided with Leonardo (Italy) in the Mediterranean Sea 30 nautical miles (56 km) off Capri and sank. Her crew were rescued.

=== Unknown date ===
List of shipwrecks: Unknown date 1928
Ship	State	Description
Arques	France	The sealer sank in a gale in southern waters. Her crew survived.
Lozère	France	The factory ship struck rocks off the Kerguelen Islands and sank. Her crew survived.

== March ==
=== 2 March ===
List of shipwrecks: 2 March 1928
Ship	State	Description
Anthony D. Nichols	United States	The four-masted schooner was destroyed by fire at El Cuyo, Yucatán, Mexico.

=== 4 March ===
List of shipwrecks: 4 March 1928
Ship	State	Description
Commercial Pioneer	United Kingdom	The cargo ship ran aground at Port Eads, Louisiana. She was refloated on 10 March.

=== 5 March ===
List of shipwrecks: 5 March 1928
Ship	State	Description
Ferndene	Latvia	The cargo ship, built in 1880, was crushed by ice and sank 9 nautical miles (17 km) off Messaragotsem (Mērsrags), Latvia. Her crew of 13 were rescued by icebreaker Krišjānis Valdemārs (Latvia).
Fumi Maru No.2	Japan	The cargo ship sank in the Inland Sea of Japan 14 nautical miles (26 km) south east of Tokuyama, Yamaguchi.
McKinley	United States	The 56-gross register ton fishing vessel sank off Spanish Reef Island (55°57′N 134°07′W) opposite Cape Decision in Southeast Alaska. Her entire crew of ten survived.

=== 7 March ===
List of shipwrecks: 7 March 1928
Ship	State	Description
Desideratum	United Kingdom	The 100.5-foot (30.6 m), 150-ton steam trawler was wrecked at Espevser, Norway.
Ionic	United Kingdom	The 101-foot (31 m), 159-ton steam trawler was damaged in a collision with the trawler Hornbill (United Kingdom). The vessel was taken under tow by Hornbill but sank off the River Humber, 4 miles (6.4 km) northeast of Spurn Head Light Ship. The crew were rescued by Hornbill.
Lucie	Turkey	The tanker was driven ashore at Samsoun and was wrecked.
Pysen	Norway	The 100.5-foot (30.6 m), 150-ton steam trawler was wrecked at Espevsaer, Norway.

=== 9 March ===
List of shipwrecks: 9 March 1928
Ship	State	Description
Hermes	Sweden	The cargo ship collided with Modeni in the Mississippi downstream of New Orleans, Louisiana and sank.
Robert E. Lee	United States	The passenger ship ran aground at Manomet, Massachusetts. She was refloated on 1 May 1928.

=== 12 March ===
List of shipwrecks: 12 March 1928
Ship	State	Description
Bandai Maru	Japan	The cargo ship foundered during a typhoon.
Kashin Maru	Japan	The cargo ship foundered during a typhoon.
Kohnryu Maru	Japan	The cargo ship foundered during a typhoon.
Mabiri	United Kingdom	The schooner sank off Sydney, New South Wales, Australia.
Muroran Maru	Japan	The cargo ship foundered during a typhoon.
Panormos	Hellenic Navy	The Fiume-class torpedo boat ran aground off Cape Tourlos, Aegina. She broke her back and was a total loss. Her crew were rescued.
Yetorofu Maru	Japan	The cargo ship foundered during a typhoon.

=== 13 March ===
List of shipwrecks: 13 March 1928
Ship	State	Description
Zannis Pendelis	Greece	The cargo ship ran aground at Boa Vista, Cape Verde Islands, Portugal. She was refloated on 26 April.

=== 14 March ===
List of shipwrecks: 14 March 1928
Ship	State	Description
Garthavon	United Kingdom	The coaster sank at Penryn, Cornwall. She was refloated later that day.
Garthloch	United Kingdom	The coaster sprang a leak and foundered in the Irish Sea 17 nautical miles (31 km) north north west of Strumble Head, Pembrokeshire. All six crew were rescued by Pallas (Finland).
Rockingham	United Kingdom	The sailing ship caught fire and sank in the Irish Sea off Galley Head, County Cork, Ireland. Her crew were rescued.

=== 16 March ===
List of shipwrecks: 16 March 1928
Ship	State	Description
Santa Rosa	United Kingdom	The auxiliary sailing vessel was driven ashore at Penmon, Anglesey. Her crew survived.
Saphoschisa	Greece	The schooner collided with City of Brisbane (United Kingdom) in the Mediterranean Sea (32°16′N 30°22′E) and was abandoned in a sinking condition. All five crew were rescued by City of Brisbane.

=== 17 March ===
List of shipwrecks: 17 March 1928
Ship	State	Description
Harold	United Kingdom	The Thames barge was abandoned in the North Sea off Saltfleet, Lincolnshire. She came ashore and was wrecked. All three crew survived.

=== 19 March ===
List of shipwrecks: 19 March 1928
Ship	State	Description
Imperator	Norway	The cargo ship ran aground at Cape San Antonio, Cuba. She was later refloated and arrived at Key West, Florida, United States on 23 March.

=== 20 March ===
List of shipwrecks: 20 March 1928
Ship	State	Description
General Byng	United Kingdom	The schooner sprang a leak in the Atlantic Ocean (42°08′N 61°17′W). She was set afire and abandoned by her crew, who were rescued by Korsholm (Sweden).
Masuno Maru	Japan	The cargo ship ran aground and sank off Hirado, Nagasaki.
Vodice	Italy	The cargo ship sprang a leak off the coast of Portugal. She was beached in the Tagus at Lisbon.

=== 21 March ===
List of shipwrecks: 21 March 1928
Ship	State	Description
John C. Hildebrand	United States	The four-masted schooner sprang a leak in the Atlantic Ocean (40°25′N 72°10′W) and was abandoned. Her crew were rescued by fishing boats.

=== 22 March ===
List of shipwrecks: 22 March 1928
Ship	State	Description
Asiatic Prince	United Kingdom	The cargo ship issued an SOS in the Pacific Ocean off Hawaii, United States, which was received by City of Eastbourne (United Kingdom). No further trace, presumed foundered.
Sultan	Germany	The cargo ship ran aground at Conakry, French West Africa. She was refloated on 27 March.

=== 23 March ===
List of shipwrecks: 23 March 1928
Ship	State	Description
Citos	Sweden	The cargo ship ran aground on the Cabezos Shoal and sank with the loss of two of her eleven crew.
Mathilte	Denmark	The coaster collided with Odensholm (Sweden) at Helsingør, Zealand and sank.
Montana	France	The cargo ship ran aground at Le Désirade, Guadeloupe. She was abandoned on 2 April, and was declared a total loss on 3 April.
Plasma	United Kingdom	The cargo ship collided with Emperor of Montreal (Italy) in the River Clyde at Dumbarton, Dunbartonshire and was beached. She was refloated on 24 March.

=== 24 March ===
List of shipwrecks: 24 March 1928
Ship	State	Description
Echo	Norway	The cargo ship ran aground in Strathlethan Bay, Aberdeenshire, United Kingdom and was abandoned by her crew.

=== 25 March ===
List of shipwrecks: 25 March 1928
Ship	State	Description
Ida Adams	United Kingdom	The 125-foot (38 m), 275-ton steam trawler was wrecked in fog on Frenchman's Rocks, or Fisherman's Rocks, northwest of Portnahaven, Rinns of Islay, she slipped off into deeper water. The crew rowed 4 miles (6.4 km) to shore in her boat.
Neptune	Belgium	The 158.1-or-125.7-foot (48.2 or 38.3 m), 278 or 275-ton steam trawler struck rocks in fog at Freswick, she slipped off the rocks into deeper water, sinking in Freswick Bay. Crew abandoned ship in her boat that was carried by the tide around Duncansby Head, landing in Gillis Bay.
Ortlinde	Germany	The cargo ship caught fire off Skagen, Denmark and was abandoned. She was towed into Gothenburg, Sweden on 28 March, and was declared likely to be a constructive total loss.

=== 26 March ===
List of shipwrecks: 26 March 1928
Ship	State	Description
Commercial	Germany	The cargo ship collided with Fritz Schoop (Germany) in the North Sea 10 nautical miles (19 km) east of Norderney, Schleswig-Holstein and sank. Her crew were rescued.

=== 27 March ===
List of shipwrecks: 27 March 1928
Ship	State	Description
Merimbula	United Kingdom	The passenger ship ran aground at Point Perpendicular, New South Wales, Australia. All on board were rescued. She was a total loss.
Wm. T. Roberts	United States	The cargo ship sank at Buffalo, New York whilst under repair.

=== 28 March ===
List of shipwrecks: 28 March 1928
Ship	State	Description
Bruxelles	Belgium	The cargo ship ran aground in the Paraná River at San Nicolás, Buenos Aires, Argentina. She was refloated on 31 March.
Steelmaker	United States	The cargo ship ran aground on Mitchell Reef, Ellice Islands and was wrecked.
Toyo Maru No.1	Japan	The cargo ship ran aground at Tsushima, Nagasaki and sank.

=== 29 March ===
List of shipwrecks: 29 March 1928
Ship	State	Description
Franzischa	Sweden	The schooner ran aground at Sandhammeren and was wrecked.

=== 31 March ===
List of shipwrecks: 31 March 1928
Ship	State	Description
Marseillais 9	France	The tug was wrecked on the Shab Aly Reef, in the Red Sea off the coast of Egypt.

== April ==
=== 1 April ===
List of shipwrecks: 1 April 1928
Ship	State	Description
Guide	United Kingdom	The schooner was wrecked at Three Rock Cove, Newfoundland. Her crew survived.

=== 2 April ===
List of shipwrecks: 2 April 1928
Ship	State	Description
Caracoli	France	The cargo ship caught fire at Port au Prince, Haiti and was beached.
Kaupanger	Norway	The cargo ship collided with Kong Sverre (Norway) at Haugesund, Norway and sank. Her crew were rescued.

=== 4 April ===
List of shipwrecks: 4 April 1928
Ship	State	Description
Pollux	Germany	The cargo ship collided with Fluor Spar in the Weser and was beached.

=== 5 April ===
List of shipwrecks: 5 April 1928
Ship	State	Description
Calicut	United Kingdom	The cargo ship ran aground at Mombasa, Kenya and was abandoned by her crew.

=== 9 April ===
List of shipwrecks: 9 April 1928
Ship	State	Description
Ellaston	United Kingdom	The cargo ship ran aground off Watch Hill, Rhode Island, United States. She was refloated on 11 April.
Fath el Rahman	Egypt	The sailing ship was destroyed by fire at Beirut, French Lebanon.

=== 10 April ===
List of shipwrecks: 10 April 1928
Ship	State	Description
Jersbek	Germany	The cargo ship ran aground at Kinlochleven, Argyll. She was refloated on 20 April.
Melpomene	France	The tanker ran aground at Sète, Hérault. She was refloated on 19 April.
M. T. Greene	United States	The coaster was destroyed by fire at Bridgeburn, Ontario, Canada.
Murao	Portugal	The coaster ran aground at Porto. Her crew were rescued by breeches buoy.

=== 12 April ===
List of shipwrecks: 12 April 1928
Ship	State	Description
Bonny	United Kingdom	The Elder Dempster 5,173 grt cargo ship ran aground and was wrecked 1 nautical mile (1.9 km) East of Cape Palmas, Liberia and was declared a total loss. She was en route from London to Douala.
Polzella	United Kingdom	The cargo ship collided with Whitby Abbey (United Kingdom in the North Sea 20 nautical miles (37 km) off Spurn Head, Yorkshire and sank. All 35 crew were rescued by Whitby Abbey.
Stjernvik	Sweden	The cargo ship collided with British Ambassador (United Kingdom) in the North Sea off the Firth of Forth and sank. Her crew were rescued by British Ambassador.
Guiding Star	United Kingdom	The schooner foundered in the Irish Sea 20 nautical miles (37 km) off Milford Haven, Pembrokeshire. Her crew were rescued by the fishing boat George and Albert (United Kingdom).

=== 16 April ===
List of shipwrecks: 16 April 1928
Ship	State	Description
Rubens	United Kingdom	The schooner ran aground on the Dry Shingle Reef, off the Isle of Pines, Cuba. She was refloated on 23 April and found to be extensively damaged.

=== 17 April ===
List of shipwrecks: 17 April 1928
Ship	State	Description
Gladiator	Germany	The tug collided with Lalandia (Denmark) in the Baltic Sea off Gedser, Denmark and sank with the loss of a crew member. Survivors were rescued by Seeteufel (Germany).
Keansburg	United States	The paddle steamer was destroyed by fire at New York.

=== 21 April ===
List of shipwrecks: 21 April 1928
Ship	State	Description
Inverampton	United Kingdom	The tanker ran aground at Maracaibo, Venezuela and was wrecked. Her crew were rescued.
Ville de Djibouti	France	The cargo ship was driven ashore at Mananjary, Madagascar in a typhoon and was wrecked. All crew were rescued.

=== 22 April ===
List of shipwrecks: 22 April 1928
Ship	State	Description
Toyo Maru No.3	Japan	The coaster foundered off Kinkwazan Island with the loss of all hands.

=== 23 April ===
List of shipwrecks: 23 April 1928
Ship	State	Description
Comte de Flandre	Belgium	The cargo ship ran aground on the Monaci Shoal, off Caprera, Italy. She was refloated but then sank with the loss of two crew.

=== 24 April ===
List of shipwrecks: 24 April 1928
Ship	State	Description
Norwich City	United Kingdom	The cargo ship struck the Second Narrows Bridge, Vancouver, British Columbia, Canada and lost her funnel and masts.

=== 25 April ===
List of shipwrecks: 25 April 1928
Ship	State	Description
Emperor of Montreal	Italy	The cargo ship ran aground at Cape Negro, Nova Scotia, Canada. She was refloated on 28 April.
Meta	Denmark	The schooner collided with the trawler St. Joachim (flag unknown) in the English Channel off Boulogne, France and sank.

=== 26 April ===
List of shipwrecks: 26 April 1928
Ship	State	Description
Overbrook	United States	The tanker caught fire in the Atlantic Ocean off the coast of Florida (28°55′N 79°20′W). Her crew were taken off by Fred W. Weller (United States) before an explosion occurred. Overbrook was taken in tow by a tug but sank 100 nautical miles (190 km) off Charleston, South Carolina.
William Booth	United States	The schooner collided with Helen Barnet Gring (United States) in the Atlantic Ocean off Chatham, Massachusetts and sank.

=== 28 April ===
List of shipwrecks: 28 April 1928
Ship	State	Description
Nordland	Germany	The cargo ship sank at the Albert Dock, London when part of her cargo of steel bars was dropped whilst being unloaded and penetrated the bottom of her hull.
South Shore	United States	The cargo ship was driven ashore south of Atlantic City, New Jersey with the loss of three of her crew. Survivors were rescued by a United States Coast Guard vessel.

=== 30 April ===
List of shipwrecks: 30 April 1928
Ship	State	Description
Mildred II	United States	The 43-gross register ton fishing vessel's gasoline engine backfired, igniting a fire that destroyed her near Turn Point Light (56°59′05″N 132°58′50″W) in Southeast Alaska. Her crew of six survived.

== May ==
=== 2 May ===
List of shipwrecks: 2 May 1928
Ship	State	Description
Upminster	United Kingdom	The cargo ship collided with Lanrick (United Kingdom) in the North Sea off the mouth of the Humber and sank. All 23 crew were rescued by Lanrick.

=== 3 May ===
List of shipwrecks: 3 May 1928
Ship	State	Description
Overton	United Kingdom	The cargo ship collided with Ethelwolf (United Kingdom) in the River Thames and was beached at Silvertown, London.
Unkai Maru No.10	Japan	The cargo ship came ashore at Shimoda and was wrecked.

=== 4 May ===
List of shipwrecks: 4 May 1928
Ship	State	Description
Ioannis Falafos	Greece	The cargo ship collided with RFA Bacchus (Royal Navy) in the English Channel 20 nautical miles (37 km) south of St. Alban's Head, Dorset (50°08′N 2°05′W) and sank with the loss of ten of her 22 crew. Survivors were rescued by RFA Bacchus, which was later abandoned by her crew and the survivors, who were rescued by Manchester Commerce (United Kingdom). RFA Bacchus was later reboarded when it was realised that she would remain afloat despite her severe damage and brought the survivors of Ioannis Falafos into Portland Harbour, towed stern first by an Admiralty tug.

=== 7 May ===
List of shipwrecks: 7 May 1928
Ship	State	Description
Navesink	United States	The dredger collided with Swinburne (United Kingdom) and sank at Stapleton, New York with some loss of life.
Iniziativa	Italy	The cargo ship ran aground at Appolonia, Sicily.

=== 9 May ===
List of shipwrecks: 9 May 1928
Ship	State	Description
Costantis Pateras	Greece	The cargo ship struck a submerged object off São Thomé, Brazil. She was consequently beached and was declared a constructive total loss.

=== 10 May ===
List of shipwrecks: 10 May 1928
Ship	State	Description
Willy	Netherlands	The cargo ship collided with Salawati (Netherlands) at IJmuiden, North Holland and was beached.

=== 15 May ===
List of shipwrecks: 15 May 1928
Ship	State	Description
Troja	Germany	The cargo ship ran aground at Puerto Plata, Dominican Republic. She was refloated on 29 May.

=== 17 May ===
List of shipwrecks: 17 May 1928
Ship	State	Description
Point Reyes	United States	The cargo ship ran aground at Cartagena, Colombia. She was refloated on 22 May.

=== 18 May ===
List of shipwrecks: 18 May 1928
Ship	State	Description
John Ericcson	United States	The cargo ship collided with A. F. Harvey (United States) in Lake Huron and was beached at Detour, Michigan.
Saint Laurent	France	The sailing vessel ran aground at La Coubre, Charente-Maritime and was wrecked.

=== 19 May ===
List of shipwrecks: 19 May 1928
Ship	State	Description
Arthur H. Zwicker	United Kingdom	The four-masted schooner was abandoned in the Atlantic Ocean off the Bahamas. Her crew were rescued.
Mohawk	United States	The passenger ship collided with Jefferson (United States) off Sandy Hook, New Jersey and was beached at Highlands. Her passengers were transferred to Seminole (United States). She was refloated on 22 May.

=== 21 May ===
List of shipwrecks: 21 May 1928
Ship	State	Description
Clearwater	United Kingdom	The cargo ship ran aground in the Saint Lawrence River at Point des Monts, Quebec, Canada. Following gale damage on 25 May, her crew were taken off by Lord Strathcona (United Kingdom). She was refloated on 24 July.

=== 23 May ===
List of shipwrecks: 23 May 1928
Ship	State	Description
Kupeha Maru	Japan	The cargo ship ran aground on the north of Okinoerabu Island, Ryukyu Islands. Salvage efforts were abandoned on 17 June.
Star of Falkland	United States	During a voyage from San Francisco, California, to Naknek, Territory of Alaska, with 288 cannery workers, a crew of 48, and a cargo of 1,776 tons of coal, livestock, and merchandise on board, the 2,330.13-gross register ton, 276.8-foot (84.4 m) ship was wrecked in fog in Unimak Pass at Akun Head (54°17′35″N 165°37′35″W) on Akun Island in the Fox Islands in the eastern Aleutian Islands. All on board were rescued before she broke up in the surf.

=== 24 May ===
List of shipwrecks: 24 May 1928
Ship	State	Description
Delvecchio	Brazil	The dredger was hit by Itajuba (Brazil) at Pernambuco and sank.

=== 29 May ===
List of shipwrecks: 29 May 1928
Ship	State	Description
Kyoto Maru	Japan	The cargo ship ran aground in the Yangtze 55 nautical miles (102 km) upstream of Wuhu, China. She was refloated on 17 June.
Tejo	Norway	The cargo ship collided with Malgache (France) in the Bay of Biscay off Brest, Finistère, France. She was towed into port by Ferrum (United Kingdom) and beached at the harbour entrance.

=== 30 May ===
List of shipwrecks: 30 May 1928
Ship	State	Description
Grainton	United Kingdom	The cargo ship ran aground on the Dry Rocks, off the coast of Florida, United States. She was refloated and taken in tow by a United States Navy tug, but sank in the early hours of 31 May.
Kenkon Maru No.12	Japan	The cargo liner collided with Hwachan (China) off Qingdao, China and sank.

=== Unknown date ===
List of shipwrecks: Unknown date 1928
Ship	State	Description
Leo Tolstoy	Soviet Union	The passenger ship caught fire at Kiev and was abandoned by her crew without raising the alarm. Nineteen passengers were killed. Twenty-four people were arrested, including the entire crew.

== June ==
=== 1 June ===
List of shipwrecks: 1 June 1928
Ship	State	Description
Bet Chala	Chile	The cargo ship was driven ashore in a gale at Valparaíso, Chile, and became a total loss.
Kershaw	United States	Carrying general cargo, the 2,741-gross register ton cargo ship was rammed by the passenger ship President Garfield (United States) in Vineyard Sound off the coast of Massachusetts eight nautical miles (15 km; 9.2 mi) east of Martha's Vineyard and sank with the loss of seven crew members in up to 85 feet (26 m) of water 1.5 nautical miles (2.8 km; 1.7 mi) east of East Chop Light at 41°28.9′N 070°31.9′W. President Garfield rescued her 30 survivors.
Linao	Chile	The cargo ship was driven ashore at Valparaíso, Chile, in a gale and broke up.

=== 4 June ===
List of shipwrecks: 4 June 1928
Ship	State	Description
Tirreno	Italy	The cargo ship ran aground in the Paraná River, Argentina. She was refloated on 13 June but was then involved in a collision with Royston Grange (United Kingdom) and was beached.

=== 5 June ===
List of shipwrecks: 5 June 1928
Ship	State	Description
Hoedic	France	The cargo ship capsized at Le Havre, Seine Maritime.

=== 6 June ===
List of shipwrecks: 6 June 1928
Ship	State	Description
Alice Laws	United Kingdom	The Thames barge collided with Matiana (United Kingdom) in the River Thames and sank .

=== 8 June ===
List of shipwrecks: 8 June 1928
Ship	State	Description
America	United States	Wreck of America, ca. 2008. The passenger ship ran aground off Isle Royale, Lake Superior and sank. All 47 people on board survived.
Marlwood	United Kingdom	The cargo ship ran aground off Ulkogrunni, Finland. She was refloated and beached at Ijoroytta.
Syria	Egypt	The cargo liner sank in the Mediterranean Sea 5 nautical miles (9.3 km) off Cape Drepano. All on board were rescued.
Thyra	Denmark	The cargo ship ran aground at Gravelines, Nord, France. She was refloated on 13 June.

=== 9 June ===
List of shipwrecks: 9 June 1928
Ship	State	Description
Madcap	United Kingdom	The schooner sprang a leak in the Bristol Channel off Lundy Island, Devon and was abandoned. Her crew were rescued by Eastleigh (United Kingdom). She was refloated later that day.

=== 12 June ===
List of shipwrecks: 12 June 1928
Ship	State	Description
Argentina	Denmark	The cargo ship ran aground at Punta Indio, Argentina. She was refloated on 16 June.

=== 14 June ===
List of shipwrecks: 14 June 1928
Ship	State	Description
Ryuun Maru	Japan	The cargo ship caught fire and was beached at Sasebo, Nagasaki.
Tiberton	United Kingdom	The cargo ship ran aground at Bahía Blanca, Argentina. She was refloated on 17 June.

=== 15 June ===
List of shipwrecks: 15 June 1928
Ship	State	Description
Augusta	United Kingdom	The tug was in collision with Woodcote (United Kingdom) in the River Thames and was beached at Millwall. She was refloated on 17 June.

=== 17 June ===
List of shipwrecks: 17 June 1928
Ship	State	Description
Diamant	Belgium	The cargo ship collided with Bellis (Sweden) in the Scheldt and was beached. She was then hit by Adour (Belgium and sank. She was refloated on 19 June.

=== 18 June ===
List of shipwrecks: 18 June 1928
Ship	State	Description
Brayside	United Kingdom	The cargo ship foundered in the Bristol Channel off St. Ives, Cornwall. Her crew survived.

=== 20 June ===
List of shipwrecks: 20 June 1928
Ship	State	Description
Antonie	Estonia	The cargo ship capsized and sank in the Baltic Sea off Ristna Point. Her crew were rescued.
Henry Ford	United States	The schooner sank at Rocky Harbour, Newfoundland. Her crew survived.

=== 21 June ===
List of shipwrecks: 21 June 1928
Ship	State	Description
Pelican	United States	The 20-gross register ton 47.3-foot (14.4 m) fishing vessel was wrecked at the mouth of the Kaliakh River (60°05′40″N 142°48′30″W) on the south-central coast of the Territory of Alaska. Her crew of three survived.

=== 22 June ===
List of shipwrecks: 22 June 1928
Ship	State	Description
Attualita	Italy	The cargo ship collided with San Quirino (United Kingdom) in the Paraná River at Buenos Aires, Argentina and sank. She was refloated on 29 June.
Pelican	United Kingdom	The coaster ran aground on The Gable, Minehead, Somerset and was wrecked. All five crew were rescued by the Minehead Lifeboat.

=== 23 June ===
List of shipwrecks: 23 June 1928
Ship	State	Description
Centaurus	Italy	The tanker caught fire at Piraeus, Greece. She was scuttled in order to extinguish the fire.
Cynthiana	United Kingdom	The cargo ship was driven ashore at Capemala, Spain and was a total loss. Her crew were rescued by Myrtle (United States). She broke in two on 11 August.
Plas Dinam	United Kingdom	The cargo ship ran aground at Freshwater Point, Newfoundland and was a total loss.

=== 26 June ===
List of shipwrecks: 26 June 1928
Ship	State	Description
Magnolia	United Kingdom	The 110.9-foot (33.8 m), 283.9-ton steam trawler broke her prop shaft at 10:30 PM on 25 June causing her to fill. She was taken in tow by trawler Amroth Castle (United Kingdom), but sank about 2:30 AM on 26 June 14 miles (23 km) off Fastnet Rock. The crew were rescued by Amroth Castle.

=== 29 June ===
List of shipwrecks: 29 June 1928
Ship	State	Description
Grecian	United States	The cargo ship collided with Evangeline (United States) in the Atlantic Ocean off Manomet, Massachusetts and was beached at Manomet.

== July ==
=== 1 July ===
List of shipwrecks: 1 July 1928
Ship	State	Description
Acme	United Kingdom	The coaster capsized and sank in the Irish Sea after her cargo shifted. All seven crew were rescued by Rimfakse (Norway).
Blue Sea	United States	The 38-gross register ton, 55.8-foot (17.0 m) fishing vessel was wrecked at Karluk, Territory of Alaska. All three people on board survived.

=== 2 July ===
List of shipwrecks: 2 July 1928
Ship	State	Description
HMS Dauntless	Royal Navy	The Danae-class cruiser ran aground on the Thrum Cap Shoal, 5 nautical miles (9.3 km) off Halifax, Nova Scotia, Canada and was abandoned by most of her 462 crew, the officers remaining on board. She was refloated on 11 July.

=== 6 July ===
List of shipwrecks: 6 July 1928
Ship	State	Description
Angamos	Chilean Navy	The fleet collier was driven ashore at Punta Morguillas and sank with the loss of 287 of the 291 people on board.
Cocle	Panama	The cargo ship struck a rock at the mouth of the Pedregal River and sank.

=== 7 July ===
List of shipwrecks: 7 July 1928
Ship	State	Description
Carmarthenshire	United Kingdom	The cargo liner caught fire in the River Thames and was beached at Erith, Kent. Her eleven passengers were taken off. Carmarthenshire was refloated on 8 July and towed to the King George V Dock, London for repairs.
Shunyo Maru	Japan	The cargo ship ran aground at Fukuhama and sank.

=== 10 July ===
List of shipwrecks: 10 July 1928
Ship	State	Description
Rahman	United Kingdom	The cargo ship capsized and sank at Chumporu, Siam.

=== 11 July ===
List of shipwrecks: 11 July 1928
Ship	State	Description
Blue Sea	United States	The motorboat became a total loss at St. Michael, Territory of Alaska.
La Frileuse	France	The schooner collided with Nerissa (United Kingdom) in the Atlantic Ocean (46°00′N 55°38′W). Her crew were taken off by Nerissa and she was set afire.

=== 12 July ===
List of shipwrecks: 12 July 1928
Ship	State	Description
Oshogbo	United Kingdom	The ship ran aground 20 nautical miles (37 km) east of Lagos, Nigeria and was wrecked.

=== 13 July ===
List of shipwrecks: 13 July 1928
Ship	State	Description
Magda	Sweden	The cargo ship ran aground on the San Ignacio Rocks, Uruguay. She was abandoned as a total loss on 17 July, and broke in two on 20 July.

=== 14 July ===
List of shipwrecks: 14 July 1928
Ship	State	Description
Augsburg	Germany	The cargo ship collided with Marigola (Italy) in the English Channel 7 nautical miles (13 km) south west of Dover, Kent, United Kingdom. She was beached at Dover. Augsburg departed Dover under tow on 5 August, bound for Bremen for repairs.
Moghreb Acsa	France	The cargo ship ran aground at Honfleur, Calvados and was abandoned by her crew. She subsequently broke in two and was a total loss.

=== 15 July ===
List of shipwrecks: 15 July 1928
Ship	State	Description
Hiddenite	United Kingdom	The sold off Castle-class trawler ran aground on rocks near Post Askaig in dense fog and rain. Refloated two days later.

=== 17 July ===
List of shipwrecks: 17 July 1928
Ship	State	Description
Hertha	Danzig	The tug collided with Johannes Westfhal (Danzig) at Danzig and sank.
Malachite	United Kingdom	The cargo ship capsized at Sydney, New South Wales, Australia.

=== 19 July ===
List of shipwrecks: 19 July 1928
Ship	State	Description
Benevolence	United Kingdom	The schooner was driven ashore at Point Rich, Labrador, Canada and was a total loss.
Lucie	United Kingdom	The schooner was driven ashore outside Killough Harbour, Northern Ireland and became a total loss. No hands lost.
Serafin Ballasteros	Spain	The cargo ship was in collision with Else (France) in the Atlantic OCean off the coast of Portugal and sank. Her crew were rescued by Else.

=== 20 July ===
List of shipwrecks: 20 July 1928
Ship	State	Description
USCGC CG-113	United States Coast Guard	The cutter was sunk in a collision with the passenger steamship SS Culberson in heavy fog off Cape May; two of her seven crewman were killed (the Coast Guard lists the date of the collision as 25 July 1928 which conflicts with the news source).
Thea	Denmark	The schooner sank in the Baltic Sea (54°21′08″N 12°14′05″E).

=== 21 July ===
List of shipwrecks: 21 July 1928
Ship	State	Description
Baychimo	United Kingdom	The cargo ship ran aground off Pole Island in Camden Bay on the north coast of the Territory of Alaska. She was refloated the next day.
New Orleans	United States	The cargo ship was destroyed by fire at Slidell, Louisiana.

=== 24 July ===
List of shipwrecks: 24 July 1928
Ship	State	Description
Active	United States	The 14-gross register ton, 40.6-foot (12.4 m) fishing vessel was beached in a sinking condition after she struck a pile off Narrow Point (55°47′N 132°28′W) on the coast of Prince of Wales Island in the Alexander Archipelago in Southeast Alaska. She became a total loss.
Arola Mendi	Spain	The cargo ship ran aground in the Paraná River at La Plata, Argentina. She was refloated on 26 July, but ran aground again.
Monte Cervantes	Germany	The ocean liner struck an object while transiting pack ice in the Arctic Ocean and began to take on water. Her passengers were put ashore at Spitsbergen. The icebreaker Krassin (Soviet Union) responded to her distress call and rendered assistance. Repairs were completed on 29 July.

=== 26 July ===
List of shipwrecks: 26 July 1928
Ship	State	Description
Anna C	Italy	The cargo ship ran aground at Punta Indio, Argentina. She was refloated on 5 August.
Cub No. 2	United States	The 13-gross register ton barge's anchor line parted during a storm while she was anchored with no cargo aboard in the harbor at St. Michael, Territory of Alaska. She washed ashore nearby and quickly broke up.

=== 27 July ===
List of shipwrecks: 27 July 1928
Ship	State	Description
Sesnon #2	United States	While anchored off Nome, Territory of Alaska, with no cargo or crew aboard, the 19-ton barge broke her moorings during a gale, was driven ashore, and was broken apart by waves.

=== 28 July ===
List of shipwrecks: 28 July 1928
Ship	State	Description
William S. Grattan	United States	While fighting a fire aboard the drifting oil barge James F. Cahill at Buffalo, New York, the fireboat was engulfed by an explosion and fire aboard the empty oil tanker B. B. McColl after James F. Cahill collided with B. B. McColl. William S. Grattan's boilers then exploded after her crew abandoned ship. One crewman was killed and seven injured aboard William S. Grattan. She eventually was rebuilt and returned to service as Edward M. Cotter.

=== 29 July ===
List of shipwrecks: 29 July 1928
Ship	State	Description
Yalou	France	The cargo ship collided with Bedecrag (United Kingdom) in the Scheldt at Nieuwe Sluis and was beached. She was refloated on 2 August. She was refloated on 5 August.

=== 31 July ===
List of shipwrecks: 31 July 1928
Ship	State	Description
Rose Castle	United Kingdom	The cargo ship collided with Montrose in the Saint Lawrence River, Quebec, Canada and was beached. She was refloated on 3 August.

== August ==
=== 2 August ===
List of shipwrecks: 2 August 1928
Ship	State	Description
Alcyon	Greece	The cargo ship ran aground at Råneå, Norrbotten County, Sweden. She was refloated but found to be leaking and was beached.

=== 3 August ===
List of shipwrecks: 3 August 1928
Ship	State	Description
Pepita	Peru	The cargo ship sprang a leak off Zorritos and was beached.

=== 4 August ===
List of shipwrecks: 4 August 1928
Ship	State	Description
Rowena	United Kingdom	The schooner ran aground in the Groals Islands, Newfoundland and was a total loss.

=== 6 August ===
List of shipwrecks: 6 August 1928
Ship	State	Description
F14	Italian Royal Navy	The F-class submarine sank in the Adriatic Sea off Pola, Italy, with the loss of 27 lives after colliding with the destroyer Giuseppe Missori (Italian Royal Navy) while surfacing during an exercise. F-14 was refloated on 7 August and scrapped.
La Blanca	United States	The cargo ship exploded and sank at Tacoma, Washington. Her crew survived.
Huronic	United Kingdom	The passenger ship ran aground on Isle Royale, Michigan. She was refloated on 19 August.

=== 7 August ===
List of shipwrecks: 7 August 1928
Ship	State	Description
F I P No. 24	United States	With no one on board, the 6-ton scow was wrecked at Kingmsill Shore (56°50′00″N 134°25′10″W) in Southeast Alaska.

=== 8 August ===
List of shipwrecks: 8 August 1928
Ship	State	Description
Olympos	Germany	The cargo ship ran aground at Philios Point, Zonguldak, Turkey. She was refloated on 15 August.
Osmandijk	Turkey	The coaster capsized at Moudania, Greece. Her crew survived.
Sinmac	United Kingdom	The tug was destroyed by fire at Point aux Trembles, Quebec, Canada. Her crew survived.

=== 9 August ===
List of shipwrecks: 9 August 1928
Ship	State	Description
Sandy	United States	While smuggling a cargo of illegal liquor in kegs, the 8-gross register ton, 38.7-foot (11.8 m) fishing vessel was destroyed at Auke Bay in Juneau, Territory of Alaska, by a fire that began when her gasoline engine backfired while it was being started. Her two-man crew was arrested by customs and Prohibition agents, who also confiscated six 10-US-gallon (38-litre; 8.3-imperial-gallon) kegs of liquor that survived the fire.

=== 10 August ===
List of shipwrecks: 10 August 1928
Ship	State	Description
Chofuku Maru	Japan	The cargo ship ran aground at Kinkazan. She was refloated on 24 August.

=== 11 August ===
List of shipwrecks: 11 August 1928
Ship	State	Description
Athena	United Kingdom	The schooner was in collision with Manchester Civilian (United Kingdom) in the Atlantic Ocean (46°56′N 6°09′W) and sank. Her crew were rescued by Manchester Civilian.
Joun Maru	Japan	The cargo ship struck the Ariadne Rocks at the mouth of the Yangtze, China and sank.
Tategami Maru	Japan	The cargo ship struck a submerged object at Shimonoseki and was beached. She was refloated on 13 August.

=== 12 August ===
List of shipwrecks: 12 August 1928
Ship	State	Description
Munamar	United Kingdom	The cargo ship ran aground off Gorda Cay, Abaco, Bahamas. She was refloated on 18 August.

=== 13 August ===
List of shipwrecks: 13 August 1928
Ship	State	Description
Chatauqua	United Kingdom	The schooner was driven ashore on Silver Bank, Turks Islands and was wrecked.
Hatsuharu	Imperial Japanese Navy	The decommissioned destroyer was sunk as a target by aircraft from the aircraft carriers Akagi and Hōshō (both Imperial Japanese Navy).
John L. Martino	United States	The schooner was dismasted and sprang a leak in the Atlantic Ocean 27 nautical miles (50 km) south of the Barnegat Peninsula. Her crew were rescued by Mayaro (United Kingdom).
Mifune Maru	Japan	The cargo ship ran aground at Notorosaki. She was refloated on 14 August.
W. H. Sawyer	United States	The cargo ship sank in Lake Huron.

=== 15 August ===
List of shipwrecks: 15 August 1928
Ship	State	Description
Martin	United Kingdom	The Thames barge collided with Roschal (Soviet Union) in the Thames Estuary off Cliffe, Kent and sank. Her crew were rescued by an Admiralty river boat. She was refloated on 16 August.

=== 16 August ===
List of shipwrecks: 16 August 1928
Ship	State	Description
Koan Maru	Japan	The cargo ship foundered off Esan, Hokkaidō (41°47′N 141°39′E).

=== 19 August ===
List of shipwrecks: 19 August 1928
Ship	State	Description
Gustav Schindler	Germany	The cargo ship ran aground at Bonny, Nigeria. Declared a total loss, she was refloated on 25 August and it was discovered that she had broken her back.
Maweema	United States	The 453-ton cod schooner was wrecked in heavy fog on Tolstoi Point (56°35′40″N 169°28′00″W) on St. George Island in the Bering Sea. Her crew of 31 abandoned ship in her boats and survived.
Queen's County	Norway	The cargo ship ran aground on St. Mary's Island, Labrador, Canada. She was abandoned the next day. Queens County was declared a total loss on 13 September.

=== 20 August ===
List of shipwrecks: 20 August 1928
Ship	State	Description
Braga	Germany	The cargo ship ran aground on Romsdal Island, Norway. She was refloated on 24 August.

=== 22 August ===
List of shipwrecks: 22 August 1928
Ship	State	Description
Großherzogin Elisabeth	Germany	The sail training ship caught fire at Hamburg and was severely damaged.
Purley Oaks	United Kingdom	The cargo ship caught fire at Buenos Aires, Argentina and was beached.
Sesnon #8	United States	With no one aboard, the 19-ton barge was wrecked at Teller, Territory of Alaska.

=== 23 August ===
List of shipwrecks: 23 August 1928
Ship	State	Description
Cumberland Coast	United Kingdom	The cargo ship caught fire in the Irish Sea and was beached at Ramsey, Isle of Man. She was refloated on 27 August.
Helène Louys	France	The schooner came ashore at Mahanoro, Madagascar and was wrecked.
Heworth	United Kingdom	The cargo ship ran aground off Hailuoto, Finland. She was refloated on 26 August.

=== 24 August ===
List of shipwrecks: 24 August 1928
Ship	State	Description
Liberal	Portugal	The cargo ship struck a submerged object at Lourenço Marques, Mozambique and was beached.
Sui Tai	United Kingdom	The cargo ship caught fire at Hong Kong and was a total loss.

=== 25 August ===
List of shipwrecks: 25 August 1928
Ship	State	Description
Daphne	France	The cargo ship collided with Passat (Germany) in the English Channel 20 nautical miles (37 km) south west of Dungeness, Kent, United Kingdom and sank. All 22 people on board were rescued by Passat.

=== 27 August ===
List of shipwrecks: 27 August 1928
Ship	State	Description
E. Rose	United Kingdom	The coaster struck the wreck of the trawler Spider (United Kingdom) in the North Sea off Lowestoft, Suffolk and sank. All seven crew were rescued by Agnes Cross ( Royal National Lifeboat Institution). She was refloated on 11 September.
Kendy	United Kingdom	The sailing ship foundered in the Bristol channel off Porthcawl, Glamorgan. All five crew were rescued by the Mumbles Lifeboat.
Kommandøren	Norway	The passenger ship ran aground at Opdalseldet, Norway. All 350 passengers were taken off.

=== 28 August ===
List of shipwrecks: 28 August 1928
Ship	State	Description
Volunteer	United States	The tug collided with Chester W. Chapin (United States) at New York and sank.

=== 29 August ===
List of shipwrecks: 29 August 1928
Ship	State	Description
Aliquippa	United States	The towing steamer capsized and sank at Aliquippa, Pennsylvania. Three crewmen drowned.

=== 31 August ===
List of shipwrecks: 31 August 1928
Ship	State	Description
Josey	Denmark	The cargo ship caught fire at Cabimas, Venezuela. She was a constructive total loss.

== September ==
=== 1 September ===
List of shipwrecks: 1 September 1928
Ship	State	Description
Castlemoor	United Kingdom	The cargo ship caught fire in the Pacific Ocean. She arrived at Albany, Western Australia on 8 September and was beached. She was refloated on 17 September.
Floridian	United States	The cargo ship collided with Admiral Fiske (United States) in the Pacific Ocean off Seattle, Washington, south of the Umatilla lightship and sank. Her crew were rescued by Admiral Fiske.

=== 5 September ===
List of shipwrecks: 5 September 1928
Ship	State	Description
Wenchow	United Kingdom	The cargo ship came ashore at Tungchow, China. She was refloated on 12 September.

=== 6 September ===
List of shipwrecks: 6 September 1928
Ship	State	Description
Llanquihue	Chile	The ship sank in the English Narrows. All on board were rescued by Valparaiso (Chile).

=== 7 September ===
List of shipwrecks: 7 September 1928
Ship	State	Description
India	United Kingdom	The cargo ship was destroyed by fire at Little Current, Ontario, Canada.
Nevesinje	Yugoslavia	The cargo ship ran aground at Parda Point, Chile. Salvage efforts were abandoned on 18 September.

=== 8 September ===
List of shipwrecks: 8 September 1928
Ship	State	Description
Maule	Chile	The cargo ship was wrecked at Columbine Point. Her crew were rescued.
Perseverance	United States	During a voyage in the waters of the south-central Territory of Alaska from Cordova to Middleton Island with a cargo of 1 1/2 tons of clothing, personal effects, and food, the 18-gross register ton 33-foot (10.1 m) motor vessel was destroyed by fire during a gale off Montague Island. Her crew of three reached shore in a dory and survived.

=== 10 September ===
List of shipwrecks: 10 September 1928
Ship	State	Description
Albert	United Kingdom	The tug foundered in Howe Sound.
Königin Luise	Germany	The ferry collided with Cornwood (United Kingdom) at Altona, Hamburg and was beached. Several passengers suffered injuries.

=== 12 September ===
List of shipwrecks: 12 September 1928
Ship	State	Description
Bessie Wilson	United Kingdom	The schooner was driven ashore at Pass Island, Newfoundland and was a total loss.
Shreveport	United States	The tanker exploded and caught fire in the Atlantic Ocean off the Frying Pan Shoals, North Carolina and was abandoned. All 29 crew were rescued by Aldecoa (Spain). The severely damaged vessel arrived at Charleston, South Carolina on 14 September.
Vigilant	United States Virgin Islands	The schooner sank in a hurricane at Christiansted.

=== 13 September ===
List of shipwrecks: 13 September 1928
Ship	State	Description
Claus Rickmers	Germany	The cargo ship collided with Clara Camus (Italy) at Glückstadt, Schleswig-Holstein and was beached.

=== 14 September ===
List of shipwrecks: 14 September 1928
Ship	State	Description
Anny	Sweden	The schooner ran aground at Norrskär and was wrecked.
A. V. Crawford	United Kingdom	The tug was driven ashore and wrecked at Southampton, Ontario, Canada.

=== 15 September ===
List of shipwrecks: 15 September 1928
Ship	State	Description
Manasoo	Canada	Carrying a crew of 19, two passengers, 115 cows, a bull, and two automobiles on a voyage from Manitowaning, Ontario, Canada, to Owen Sound, Ontario, the cargo liner rolled over and sank in three to five minutes off Griffith Island in Georgian Bay during a storm with the immediate loss of 13 crew and both passengers. Six crewmen floated on a raft for 60 hours, during which one died of exposure, before the five survvivors were rescued by the Canadian Pacific Railway steamer Manitoba (Canada) on 17 September. Manasoo′s wreck was discovered in 2018 in 210 feet (64 m) of water 0.5 miles (0.8 km) off Griffith Island at 44°51′03.59″N 080°52′07.96″W.
Varild	Norway	The cargo ship came ashore at Siglunes, Iceland. Her crew were rescued.

=== 17 September ===
List of shipwrecks: 17 September 1928
Ship	State	Description
Oliva	United Kingdom	The tanker ran aground at Bennan Head, Arran. Salvage efforts were abandoned on 18 September.

=== 18 September ===
List of shipwrecks: 18 September 1928
Ship	State	Description
Lygnern	Sweden	The cargo ship, which had arrived at Fremantle, Western Australia from Gothenburg, Sweden, struck an uncharted shoal when anchoring in Gage Roads, destroying the rudder and disabling her engine. She then drifted onto Beagle Rock where she remained fast. Refloating efforts were abandoned on 20 September. She was declared a total loss on 1 October.
Manasoo	United Kingdom	The cargo ship foundered in Georgian Bay with the loss of fifteen lives.

=== 19 September ===
List of shipwrecks: 19 September 1928
Ship	State	Description
Rosinco	United States	The motor yacht was wrecked in Lake Michigan off Kenosha, Wisconsin.

=== 20 September ===
List of shipwrecks: 20 September 1928
Ship	State	Description
Eolo	Argentina	The cargo ship collided with Olympier (Belgium) in the Paraná River at Buenos Aires and sank.
Tista	Norway	The cargo ship ran aground on Holmengrå, Norway and was a total loss. Her crew were rescued.

=== 21 September ===
List of shipwrecks: 21 September 1928
Ship	State	Description
Stimson	United States	The four-masted schooner came ashore at Grand Cayman, Cayman Islands and was wrecked.
Willbabco	United States	The cargo ship sprang a leak in the Atlantic Ocean (31°05′N 74°32′W) and was abandoned. She was subsequently taken in tow by Hoxbar (United States) and taken to Baltimore, Maryland.

=== 22 September ===
List of shipwrecks: 22 September 1928
Ship	State	Description
Washtenaw	United States	The cargo ship capsized at Los Angeles, California.

=== 23 September ===
List of shipwrecks: 23 September 1928
Ship	State	Description
L.S. 212	France	The barque came ashore off the La Coubre Lighthouse, Charente-Maritime and was wrecked.

=== 25 September ===
List of shipwrecks: 25 September 1928
Ship	State	Description
Maria Pitango	Germany	The cargo ship developed a leaky boiler in the Atlantic Ocean. She was towed by Comanchee (United Kingdom) for 1,000 nautical miles (1,900 km) towards the Azores, Portugal but sprang a leak when within reach of a port. Comanchee assisted pumping operations for a week, but she eventually foundered. All crew were rescued and landed at Horta.

=== 26 September ===
List of shipwrecks: 26 September 1928
Ship	State	Description
Ikaross	United States	The 22-gross register ton motor vessel was destroyed on the south-central coast of the Territory of Alaska between Cordova and a cannery on the Eyak River (60°30′N 145°40′W) by a fire that began when her gasoline engine backfired. Her crew of three survived.
Taiyo Maru	Japan	The cargo ship ran aground on the west coast of Sakhalin, Soviet Union. She was refloated on 21 October but found to be severely damaged. Taiyo Maru was taken to Hakodate. She was driven ashore again 29 October.

=== 27 September ===
List of shipwrecks: 27 September 1928
Ship	State	Description
Alba	Chile	The passenger ship came ashore at Cape San Antonio, Argentina and was wrecked. All on board were rescued.

=== 28 September ===
List of shipwrecks: 28 September 1928
Ship	State	Description
Ida C	United States	The 8-gross register ton motor vessel was destroyed about 500 yards (460 m) east of Duke Island in the Gravina Islands of the Alexander Archipelago in Southeast Alaska by a fire that started in her cabin when she ran aground and heeled sharply, causing a 20-US-gallon (76 L; 17 imp gal) can of gasoline to spill. Both people on board survived.

=== 29 September ===
List of shipwrecks: 29 September 1928
Ship	State	Description
Brackley	United Kingdom	The sailing ship was wrecked at Glendore, County Cork, Ireland. Her crew were rescued.

=== 30 September ===
List of shipwrecks: 30 September 1928
Ship	State	Description
Yser	Belgium	The cargo ship caught fire in the North Sea off the Wandelaar Lightship (Belgium). She was anchored at Ramekens, Netherlands and was burnt out.

=== Unknown date ===
List of shipwrecks: Unknown date 1928
Ship	State	Description
USCGC CG-188	United States Coast Guard	The cutter was destroyed by a hurricane.

== October ==
=== 1 October ===
List of shipwrecks: 1 October 1928
Ship	State	Description
Axpe Mendi	Spain	The cargo ship ran aground on the Hartwell Reef, Boa Vista, Cape Verde Islands, Portugal and was a total loss.
Flower o' Portsoy	United Kingdom	The schooner ran aground in Bull's Cove, Clonakilty, County Cork, Ireland and was wrecked. Her crew were rescued.

=== 3 October ===
List of shipwrecks: 3 October 1928
Ship	State	Description
Ondine	Marine Nationale	The Ariane-class submarine collided with the cargo ship Ekaterina Goulandris (Greece) off Vigo, Galicia, Spain, and sank in the Atlantic Ocean at 42°00′N 009°06′W with the loss of all 43 crew.
Priscilla	United Kingdom	The cargo ship ran aground in the River Ribble at Preston, Lancashire. She was refloated on 11 October.

=== 4 October ===
List of shipwrecks: 4 October 1928
Ship	State	Description
USS Elcano	United States Navy	The Elcano-class gunboat was sunk as a target, probably in the Shanghai, China area.

=== 5 October ===
List of shipwrecks: 5 October 1928
Ship	State	Description
Beau Bassin	United Kingdom	The cargo ship caught fire at Port Louis, Mauritius and was declared a total loss. She was refloated on 5 November.
M. J. Bartelme	United Kingdom	The cargo ship ran aground in Sturgeon Bay. She was abandoned at a total loss on 10 October due to severe hogging.
Thistleben	United Kingdom	The cargo ship collided with Hanley (United States) and sank.

=== 6 October ===
List of shipwrecks: 6 October 1928
Ship	State	Description
City of Lancaster	United Kingdom	The cargo ship collided with San Gerardo in the Thames Estuary off the Nore and was beached on the West Oaze Bank. She was refloated on 10 October.

=== 8 October ===
List of shipwrecks: 8 October 1928
Ship	State	Description
Hai An	China	The cargo ship sank at Taipingwan.

=== 9 October ===
List of shipwrecks: 9 October 1928
Ship	State	Description
John Llewellyn	United Kingdom	The schooner was wrecked on Square Island, Labrador, Canada. Her crew were rescued.
USS Villalobos	United States Navy	The gunboat was sunk as a destroyer gunnery target off the coast of China.

=== 10 October ===
List of shipwrecks: 10 October 1928
Ship	State	Description
Charbomine	Belgium	The cargo ship collided with Ostara (Germany) in the Kaiser Wilhelm Canal, Germany and sank.

=== 14 October ===
List of shipwrecks: 14 October 1928
Ship	State	Description
David C. Reid	United States	The tanker issued an SOS in the Atlantic Ocean off the Azores, Portugal (26°36′N 45°28′W). No further trace, believed foundered with the loss of all hands.
Iskria	Poland	The auxiliary schooner collided with Grey County (Norway) in the English Channel. She was taken in tow by Lady Duncannon (United Kingdom) and beached at Dover, Kent, United Kingdom.

=== 15 October ===
List of shipwrecks: 15 October 1928
Ship	State	Description
Hsin Shutung	China	The cargo ship collided with Hsin Shih (China) in the Yangtze 40 nautical miles (74 km) downstream of Hankow.
Ruperra	United Kingdom	The cargo ship ran aground on Maio, Cape Verde Islands, Portugal. She was refloated on 26 October.

=== 16 October ===
List of shipwrecks: 16 October 1928
Ship	State	Description
Hsin Kong	China	The cargo ship collided with Yunhsing (China) in the Taku Deephole and sank.

=== 17 October ===
List of shipwrecks: 17 October 1928
Ship	State	Description
Seldovia	United States	The 144-ton, 57-foot (17 m) fishing scow sank at Barren Island (54°44′45″N 131°20′30″W) in Southeast Alaska.

=== 18 October ===
List of shipwrecks: 18 October 1928
Ship	State	Description
Balder	Finland	The schooner was wrecked at Lagskar with the loss of four crew.
Excelsior	United Kingdom	The Thames barge was severely damaged by fire at Faversham, Kent.
Parks Foster	United States	The cargo ship came ashore at Alpena, Michigan. She was refloated on 31 October.
Yser	France	The cargo ship came ashore at Belle Isle, France and was wrecked.

=== 19 October ===
List of shipwrecks: 19 October 1928
Ship	State	Description
Alice Verzone	United States	The four-masted schooner was driven ashore at Ocean Bight, Bahamas and was wrecked. Her crew survived.
Professor B Jitkov	Soviet Union	Abandoned in pack ice off Dikson Island, Arctic Ocean.

=== 20 October ===
List of shipwrecks: 20 October 1928
Ship	State	Description
Northern King	United States	The 11-gross register ton motor vessel was destroyed at a wharf in Shearwater Bay (57°20′N 152°55′W) on the south-central coast of the Territory of Alaska by an explosion caused by gasoline in her engine room and a subsequent fire. The only person aboard survived.
St. Brandan	United Kingdom	The coaster ran aground on the Cairns of Coll, Argyll and was wrecked. Her crew were rescued by the trawler City of York (United Kingdom).
Silva Rios	Portugal	The sailing vessel was lost off Newfoundland.

=== 21 October ===
List of shipwrecks: 21 October 1928
Ship	State	Description
William Balls	United Kingdom	The cargo ship ran aground on Vatneholmen, Norway. She was refloated on 25 October.

=== 22 October ===
List of shipwrecks: 22 October 1928
Ship	State	Description
Alison	United Kingdom	The coaster collided with Zillah (United Kingdom) at Cobh, County Cork, Ireland and sank. Her crew were rescued.
Anna Helen	United States	During a voyage from Hoonah to Haines, Territory of Alaska, with a cargo of 1,000 pounds (450 kg) of dental equipment, the 12-gross register ton motor vessel was destroyed at the junction of Icy Strait and Lynn Canal in the Alexander Archipelago in Southeast Alaska about 2 nautical miles (3.7 km; 2.3 mi) outside the entrance to Funter Bay by a fire that began when her gasoline engine backfired and triggered a gasoline explosion. Her crew of two abandoned ship in a dory and was rescued by the motor vessel Gloria (United States). Anna Helen was deemed a total loss.
Georgina	Portugal	The sailing vessel was wrecked at Rabat, Morocco.

=== 24 October ===
List of shipwrecks: 24 October 1928
Ship	State	Description
Adolph Woermann	Germany	The ocean liner ran aground at Cape Spartivento, Sardinia, Italy. She was refloated on 26 October.
Cairntorr	United Kingdom	The cargo ship came ashore in Coacoacho Bay, Nova Scotia, Canada (50°08′N 60°15′W) and was abandoned by her crew. She broke in two on 26 October and was a total loss.

=== 27 October ===
List of shipwrecks: 27 October 1928
Ship	State	Description
Laberge	United Kingdom	The cargo ship was wrecked at Muddy Shag, Fogo, Newfoundland.

=== 31 October ===
List of shipwrecks: 31 October 1928
Ship	State	Description
Numidia	France	The mail ship sank at Marseille, Bouches-du-Rhône. She was refloated on 17 November.
Twins	United States	Pulled up on the beach for the winter at Golovin, Territory of Alaska, when a storm struck, the 14-gross register ton, 42-foot (13 m) fishing vessel was crushed by ice and then broken up by waves.

== November ==
=== 1 November ===
List of shipwrecks: 1 November 1928
Ship	State	Description
Cawdor	United Kingdom	The 125.7-foot (38.3 m), 290-ton steam trawler, a sold off Castle-class naval trawler, sprung a leak on 30 October and was abandoned the next day with the crew being taken off by trawler Creswell (United Kingdom), sinking on 1 November in the Atlantic Ocean (53°25′N 12°30′W).
Umbria	Italy	The cargo ship ran aground at Istanbul, Turkey. She was refloated on 4 November.

=== 2 November ===
List of shipwrecks: 2 November 1928
Ship	State	Description
Gazelle	Netherlands	The auxiliary sailing vessel ran aground at Allinge-Sandvig, Bornholm, Denmark. Her crew were rescued.
Michigan	United States	The cargo ship ran aground on the Pasig Reef (approximately 12°N 125°E). She was abandoned on 9 November.

=== 3 November ===
List of shipwrecks: 3 November 1928
Ship	State	Description
Havlyst	Norway	The cargo ship sprang a leak in the North Sea and was abandoned in a sinking condition. Her crew were rescued by the trawler Sabina (United Kingdom).

=== 4 November ===
List of shipwrecks: 4 November 1928
Ship	State	Description
Ingunn	Norway	The cargo ship foundered north of Kopervik, Norway. Thirteen crew were rescued by Star (Soviet Union).

=== 5 November ===
List of shipwrecks: 5 November 1928
Ship	State	Description
Gilda Scuderi	United States	The cargo ship departed Seattle, Washington for Kobe, Japan. No further trace, presumed foundered in the Pacific Ocean with the loss of all hands.
Skipper	United Kingdom	The cargo liner ran aground on Saint-Pierre, Saint Pierre and Miquelon. Her passengers and some of the crew were taken off. She broke in two on 7 November and was a total loss.

=== 6 November ===
List of shipwrecks: 6 November 1928
Ship	State	Description
Pallas	Germany	The cargo ship collided with another vessel off Gedser, Sjælland, Denmark and was beached.
Rowanburn	United Kingdom	The cargo ship caught fire at Palamós, Catalonia, Spain. She was completely gutted and sank, but was refloated on 13 November.
Solway Firth	United Kingdom	The coaster struck a submerged wreck in the Thames Estuary and subsequently foundered. All ten crew were rescued by the Margate Lifeboat.

=== 7 November ===
List of shipwrecks: 7 November 1928
Ship	State	Description
Erno	United Kingdom	The tug sank at Avonmouth, Somerset.
Ioannis	Greece	The cargo ship came ashore 12 nautical miles (22 km) east of Tangier, Tangier International Zone. Her crew were taken off by Em. Z Svitzer (flag unknown). She was refloated on 23 December.

=== 10 November ===
List of shipwrecks: 10 November 1928
Ship	State	Description
Hsin Chi	China	The passenger ship ran aground on Tai Island, north of San-tuao. She was attacked by pirates the next day. Hsin Chi was looted and burnt. HMS Serapis (Royal Navy) captured two junks and some fishing vessels, along with some of the pirates and loot. They were handed over to Chinese authorities.

=== 12 November ===
List of shipwrecks: 12 November 1928
Ship	State	Description
Ortega	United Kingdom	The cargo ship ran aground at Port-au-Prince, Haiti. She was refloated on 27 December.
Vestris	United Kingdom	Vestris The passenger ship foundered in the Atlantic Ocean approximately 200 nautical miles (370 km) off the Hampton Roads, Virginia, United States with the loss of between 110 and 127 lives.

=== 15 November ===
List of shipwrecks: 15 November 1928
Ship	State	Description
Alice	Latvia	The cargo ship collided with Smyrna (Germany) in the English Channel off Dungeness, Kent and sank. All crew were rescued by Smyrna.
Imperial	United States	The 30-gross register ton fishing vessel departed Juneau, Territory of Alaska, with a crew of six aboard and was never heard from again. She presumably sank in a storm in the Gulf of Alaska.
Mary Stanford	Royal National Lifeboat Institution	The lifeboat capsized and sank at Rye Harbour, Sussex whilst going to the rescue of Alice (Latvia) with the loss of all seventeen crew.
Nagasaki Maru No.1	Japan	The cargo ship collided with Shinsei Maru No.1 (Japan) off the west coast of Sakhalin, Soviet Union and sank. Only three crew survived.

=== 16 November ===
List of shipwrecks: 16 November 1928
Ship	State	Description
Ethel Everard	United Kingdom	The Thames barge was driven ashore at Birchington, Kent. All four crew were rescued by the Margate Lifeboat.
Kentish Coast	United Kingdom	The coaster was driven ashore in Jennycliffe Bay, Plymouth Sound in a gale after putting back (Plymouth for Teignmouth). All fourteen crew were rescued by breeches buoy and lifeboat. She was refloated on 26 November and sold for scrap.
Mary Ann	United Kingdom	The schooner was driven ashore at Dulas, Anglesey with the loss of five of her six crew.
Mary Barrow	United Kingdom	The three-masted schooner foundered in the English Channel off North Foreland, Kent. All six crew were rescued by the Ramsgate Lifeboat.
Saga	Finland	The schooner came ashore at Dragør, Denmark. She was refloated on 20 November.

=== 17 November ===
List of shipwrecks: 17 November 1928
Ship	State	Description
Eltham	United Kingdom	The coaster ran aground at Chapel Porth, Cornwall. She broke in two the next day and was a total loss.
Grönland	Germany	The cargo ship sank in the Great Belt off Korsør, Denmark.
Maiwara	United Kingdom	The cargo ship ran aground on the Wassanga Reef, New Hanover Island, New Guinea. She was refloated on 22 November.

=== 18 November ===
List of shipwrecks: 18 November 1928
Ship	State	Description
Camilla May Page	United States	Carrying a cargo of coal, the 176-foot (54 m), 688-gross register ton four-masted schooner was wrecked at the entrance to Portsmouth Harbor off Jaffrey Point, New Castle, New Hampshire, during a gale.
Malmö	Sweden	The cargo ship came ashore on Ameland, the Netherlands, with the loss of a crew member. The majority of the survivors abandoned ship. She was declared a total loss.

=== 19 November ===
List of shipwrecks: 19 November 1928
Ship	State	Description
Bessa	Norway	The cargo ship ran aground at Porto, Portugal. She was refloated on 29 November.

=== 21 November ===
List of shipwrecks: 21 November 1928
Ship	State	Description
USS Pampanga	United States Navy	The gunboat was scuttled off the coast of China by USS Asheville and USS Sacramento (both United States Navy).

=== 22 November ===
List of shipwrecks: 22 November 1928
Ship	State	Description
Herrenwyk	Germany	The cargo ship sank in the Atlantic Ocean (54°28′N 23°53′W). Thirteen crew were rescued by Estonia (Denmark).

=== 23 November ===
List of shipwrecks: 23 November 1928
Ship	State	Description
Alpha	United Kingdom	The cargo ship was driven ashore 25 nautical miles (46 km) north of Esmeraldas, Ecuador and was wrecked.
Hagfors	Sweden	The cargo ship came ashore at Borkum, Germany. Her crew were rescued. Salvage efforts were abandoned on 24 November.
Herrenwyk	Germany	The 315.6-foot (96.2 m), 2,514-ton cargo vessel sank in a gale in the North Atlantic (53°32′N 24°00′W). Thirteen crew were killed and thirteen others were rescued by Estonia (Denmark).
Käte Grammerstorf	Germany	The cargo ship foundered in the North Sea. Her crew were rescued by Flora (Denmark).
Virginia	Greece	The cargo ship collided with another vessel off Leixões, Portugal and sank.

=== 24 November ===
List of shipwrecks: 24 November 1928
Ship	State	Description
Cariboo	United Kingdom	The Elder Dempster 7,275 grt cargo ship struck a submerged rock 40 nautical miles (74 km) south west of East London, South Africa and sank. She was en route from Beira to New York City. Her crew were rescued by Buffalo and Windsor Castle (both United Kingdom).
Heinrich Podeus	Germany	The cargo ship came ashore at Noordwijk, Netherlands. Her crew were rescued.
Prince of Wales	United States	Carrying one passenger, a crew of six, and a cargo of 15 tons of general merchandise and mail, the 98-gross register ton, 58.5-foot (17.8 m) motor vessel ran aground on a rock at St. Philip Island (55°39′N 133°25′W) in the Alexander Archipelago in Southeast Alaska. A rising tide refloated and flooded her, making in impossible to start her engine. She was sailed to Heceta Island and tied up there, but sank in 240 feet (73.2 m) water before assistance could arrive. There were no deaths.

=== 25 November ===
List of shipwrecks: 25 November 1928
Ship	State	Description
Cesaré	France	The cargo ship foundered in the Mediterranean Sea off Cape Caxine, Algeria with the loss of fifteen of her eighteen crew.
Chislehurst	United Kingdom	The cargo ship was beached on Goodwick Sands, Pembrokeshire.
Christian Michelsen	Norway	The cargo ship was driven ashore north of Hook of Holland, Netherlands with the loss of three crew. All but two crew abandoned ship.
Emile Delmas	France	The cargo ship was abandoned in Liverpool Bay and drifted ashore at Formby, Lancashire. Twenty three of her 24 crew were rescued by the New Brighton Lifeboat.
Høydal	Norway	Norwegian auxiliary cargo schooner was wrecked at Texel, the Netherlands in a storm. The crew was saved by a German ship.
Pommern	Germany	The barque was totally dismasted in the English Channel. Her 79 crew were taken off by Heros (Germany). Assistance offered by Lancastria (United Kingdom) but was refused. Pommern was towed into Saint-Malo, Finistère, France, where she arrived on 30 November.

=== 26 November ===
List of shipwrecks: 26 November 1928
Ship	State	Description
Barbara	Italy	The cargo ship foundered in the Gulf of Gascony. Fifteen crew were rescued by the trawler La Coubre (France).
IJmuiden Lifeboat	Netherlands	The lifeboat capsized with the loss of a crew member whilst going to the assistance of Salento (Italy).
Ellen	Denmark	The schooner was driven ashore 20 nautical miles (37 km) north of Bayonne, Basses-Pyrénées, France. Her crew were rescued.
Salento	Italy	The cargo ship was driven ashore at Zandvoort, Netherlands and sank with the loss of all hands.

=== 27 November ===
List of shipwrecks: 27 November 1928
Ship	State	Description
Harris	Denmark	The schooner was reported mastless, abandoned and derelict in the North Sea (51°30′N 2°46′E). She came ashore at Ostend, West Flanders, Belgium the next day and was a total loss.

=== 28 November ===
List of shipwrecks: 28 November 1928
Ship	State	Description
Charles M. Struven	United States	The schooner was destroyed by fire at New York.

=== 30 November ===
List of shipwrecks: 30 November 1928
Ship	State	Description
Cedella	United Kingdom	The schooner was driven ashore at Little Bras d'Or, Nova Scotia, Canada and was a total loss.
Chief Maquilla	United Kingdom	The cargo ship developed a severe list in the Pacific Ocean off the Aleutian Islands, Alaska, United States. She was abandoned on 1 December. Her crew were rescued by Yogen Maru (Japan).
Euzkadi	Philippines	The steam cargo ship foundered in a typhoon off Manila, the Philippines, with the loss of seven lives. She later was salvaged and returned to service as Southern Trader (Philippines).
Misaki Maru No.3	Japan	The cargo ship ran aground off Maoka. She was refloated on 29 August 1932.

=== Unknown date ===
List of shipwrecks: Unknown date November 1928
Ship	State	Description
Brunvoll	United States	The 42-gross register ton, 56.2-foot (17.1 m) halibut-fishing schooner was last seen on 15 November. She subsequently disappeared in a severe storm somewhere northwest of Middleton Island off the south-central coast of the Territory of Alaska with the loss of her entire crew of seven men.

== December ==
=== 1 December ===
List of shipwrecks: 1 December 1928
Ship	State	Description
Sundemar	Sweden	The cargo ship ran aground at Gravelines, Nord, France. She was refloated on 11 December.
Truth	United States	During a voyage in the Territory of Alaska from Metlakatla to Dall Island, the 15-gross register ton 45.8-foot (14.0 m) fishing vessel broke free of her moorings during a storm while at anchor with no one aboard and sank without loss of life in Nichols Passage (55°05′N 131°42′W) in the Alexander Archipelago in Southeast Alaska.

=== 2 December ===
List of shipwrecks: 2 December 1928
Ship	State	Description
Whitebelle	United Kingdom	The schooner was driven ashore at Beaver Harbour, New Brunswick, Canada and was wrecked.

=== 4 December ===
List of shipwrecks: 4 December 1928
Ship	State	Description
Hokuto Maru	Japan	The cargo ship sank off Hakodate.
Ronturn	United Kingdom	The cargo ship ran aground in the Paraná River, Argentina. She was refloated on 7 December.

=== 5 December ===
List of shipwrecks: 5 December 1928
Ship	State	Description
British Courage	United Kingdom	The tanker caught fire in the Mediterranean Sea (approximately 34°N 24°E) and was abandoned. Her crew were rescued by Uarda (Germany). She was reboarded on 7 December, arriving at Bombah Bay on 9 December and Alexandria, Egypt on 14 December.

=== 7 December ===
List of shipwrecks: 7 December 1928
Ship	State	Description
Blenda	Sweden	The cargo ship foundered in the Kattegat off the Anholt Lightship (Denmark) with the loss of four of her eleven crew.
Quintero	Chile	The cargo ship collided with America (Chile) and sank.

=== 8 December ===
List of shipwrecks: 8 December 1928
Ship	State	Description
Antonietta	Italy	The cargo ship ran aground at Point Leona, Spain. She sank the next day.

=== 10 December ===
List of shipwrecks: 10 December 1928
Ship	State	Description
Aplandet	Norway	The cargo ship foundered in the Baltic Sea. Her crew were rescued by N. C. Monberg (Denmark).
Celtic	United Kingdom	Celtic The ocean liner ran aground on the Cow and Calf Rocks, off Cobh, County Cork, Ireland. All on board were rescued. She was abandoned as a total loss. Celtic was scrapped in 1933.
Raisdale	United Kingdom	The cargo ship ran aground on a reef (approximately 7°S 115°E). She was refloated on 17 December and towed to Surabaya, Netherlands East Indies.

=== 11 December ===
List of shipwrecks: 11 December 1928
Ship	State	Description
Haarfagre	Norway	The cargo ship came ashore at Craster, Northumberland, United Kingdom. Eleven of her thirteen crew were taken off.
Matilda	United Kingdom	The 82-foot (25 m), 100-ton motor-sailer was sunk in a collision with the trawler Joseph Button (United Kingdom) in the "Haven". Four crew were killed.
Morinda	United Kingdom	The cargo ship ran aground at Dedele Point, New Guinea. She was refloated on 28 December.
Pezuta	Canada	The steam barge was wrecked in a storm going ashore in the Naikoon Provincial Park, Haida Gwaii archipelago, British Columbia, Canada. Now known as Pesuta.
Thursonian	United Kingdom	The schooner was abandoned in the North Sea off the coast of Norfolk. All five crew were rescued by the Cromer Lifeboat. She came ashore at Mundesley and sank.
Zawosan Maru	Japan	The cargo ship ran aground at Nemuro, Hokkaidō. She was refloated on 17 December.

=== 12 December ===
List of shipwrecks: 12 December 1928
Ship	State	Description
Matilda	United Kingdom	The schooner collided with the trawler Joseph Button at Milford Haven, Pembrokeshire and sank with the loss of three of her four crew.
Thirso	(United Kingdom) Guernsey	The cargo ship struck wreckage off La Corbière, Jersey and was abandoned. Her crew were rescued and she was towed into a Jersey port.

=== 13 December ===
List of shipwrecks: 13 December 1928
Ship	State	Description
Diver Jack	United Kingdom	The schooner came ashore on Horse Chops Island, Labrador, Canada. Her crew were rescued.
Edward B. Winslow	United States	The schooner was abandoned in the Atlantic Ocean (40°27′N 71°50′W). Her crew were rescued by Cerro Ebano (United States).
Mallina	Australia	The cargo ship ran aground in the Brisbane River near the Victoria Bridge in Brisbane, Australia. The vessel was refloated and returned to service.

=== 14 December ===
List of shipwrecks: 14 December 1928
Ship	State	Description
København	Denmark	The barque departed Buenos Aires, Argentina in December bound for Australia but never arrived.

=== 15 December ===
List of shipwrecks: 15 December 1928
Ship	State	Description
Bush	United Kingdom	The 128.4-foot (39.1 m) steam trawler ran on rocks in dense fog off the Mull of Cantire. Refloated 22 December.
Casper	United States	The Design 1022 cargo ship ran aground at Utö, Finland (59°41′N 21°34′E) and was abandoned by her crew. She caught fire on 24 December and was a total loss.
Maryland	United States	The 29-gross register ton motor vessel was wrecked on the south-central coast of the Territory of Alaska 5.5 nautical miles (10.2 km; 6.3 mi) east of Ocean Cape (59°32′30″N 139°51′30″W). Her crew survived.

=== 16 December ===
List of shipwrecks: 16 December 1928
Ship	State	Description
Delfina	Spain	The cargo shipo struck a rock 7 nautical miles (13 km) off The Skerries, Wales and was abandoned. Her crew were rescued by Huntsman (United Kingdom). Delfina sank the next day.

=== 17 December ===
List of shipwrecks: 17 December 1928
Ship	State	Description
Hedstrommen	Sweden	The cargo ship collided with Heimdal (Germany) at Kiel, Schleswig-Holstein, Germany and sank. She was refloated on 23 December.

=== 18 December ===
List of shipwrecks: 18 December 1928
Ship	State	Description
Lagoa	Portugal	The cargo ship ran aground north of Villa de Condo. She broke in two on 29 December and sank.

=== 20 December ===
List of shipwrecks: 20 December 1928
Ship	State	Description
Fortunato	Italy	The brigantine was abandoned in the Mediterranean Sea (41°42′N 6°09′E) with the loss of a crew member. Survivors were rescued by Charterhague (United Kingdom). She was discovered 80 nautical miles (150 km) south of Porquerolles, Var, France by a Swedish ship and towed to Hyères.

=== 21 December ===
List of shipwrecks: 21 December 1928
Ship	State	Description
West Totant	United States	The Design 1013 cargo ship ran aground in Ballyholme Bay, Northern Ireland. She was refloated on 28 December.

=== 22 December ===
List of shipwrecks: 22 December 1928
Ship	State	Description
Comrade	United States	The 9-gross register ton motor vessel was driven ashore on Lung Island (56°30′45″N 130°04′15″W) at the south end of Duncan Canal in the Alexander Archipelago in Southeast Alaska. The force of her grounding tipped a lantern on board, which resulted in an explosion and fire that destroyed her. Her crew of two survived.
Gertrude Parsons	United Kingdom	The schooner was driven ashore at Tennycape, Nova Scotia, Canada and was wrecked.
Resolute	United Kingdom	The tug ran aground in Liverpool Bay and was beached at Hoylake, Cheshire. All four crew survived.

=== 23 December ===
List of shipwrecks: 23 December 1928
Ship	State	Description
Mabel Gale	United States	The four-masted schooner foundered in the Atlantic Ocean off Lobos Island, Canary Islands, Spain. Her crew were rescued.
Rudolf	Germany	The cargo ship ran aground at Husum, Schleswig-Holstein. She was refloated on 27 December.

=== 24 December ===
List of shipwrecks: 24 December 1928
Ship	State	Description
Wandle	United Kingdom	The coaster collided with Baltara (United Kingdom) in the River Thames at Wapping, London and was beached.

=== 25 December ===
List of shipwrecks: 25 December 1928
Ship	State	Description
Hock Seng	United Kingdom	The cargo ship, from Surabaya for Singapore in tow of tug Kraus, went aground on Karimoen island, Java and became a total loss; the tug was lost on 28 December in salvage attempts.

=== 27 December ===
List of shipwrecks: 27 December 1928
Ship	State	Description
Mevania	United States	The tanker was driven ashore at Tampico, Tamaulipas, Mexico. She was refloated on 25 January 1929.
USCGC Poinsettia	United States Coast Guard	The cutter was destroyed by a fire and explosion.
Tokwa Maru	Japan	The cargo ship was driven ashore on Rishiri Island and was wrecked.

=== 28 December ===
List of shipwrecks: 28 December 1928
Ship	State	Description
Kraus	Netherlands	The tug, from Surabaya for Singapore, lost her propeller whilst attempting salvage of her tow, cargo ship Hock Seng, which had grounded on 25 December; she also went ashore on Karimoen island, Java and was lost.

=== 29 December ===
List of shipwrecks: 29 December 1928
Ship	State	Description
Bonne Tante	France	The schooner foundered in the English Channel. Her crew were rescued.

=== 30 December ===
List of shipwrecks: 30 December 1928
Ship	State	Description
Hereford	United Kingdom	The Thames barge collided with Grutto (Netherlands) in the River Thames and sank. She was refloated on 31 December.
Paul Lecat	France	The ocean liner was destroyed by fire at Marseille, Bouches-du-Rhône.

=== 31 December ===
List of shipwrecks: 31 December 1928
Ship	State	Description
Harald	Germany	The cargo ship collided with Batavier I (Netherlands) off Brunsbüttelkoog, Schleswig-Holstein and sank.
Hontestroom	Netherlands	The cargo ship collided with Birtley (United Kingdom) in the River Thames at Crayford, Kent and was beached.

== Unknown date ==
List of shipwrecks: Unknown date 1928
Ship	State	Description
Capt. Worden	United States	The 12-gross register ton vessel dragged her anchor and was wrecked on the beach at Dillingham, Territory of Alaska, sometime after 15 November.
