= Sigron =

Coordinates: 39°12′46″N 25°51′23″E

Sigron (Ancient Greek: Σἱγρον), or Sigrion (Σἱγριον), was a port town of ancient Lesbos.

The site of Sigron is located near modern Sigri.
