= Megalonisi Lighthouse =

Lighthouse in Greece

Coordinates: 39°12′45″N 25°49′58″E

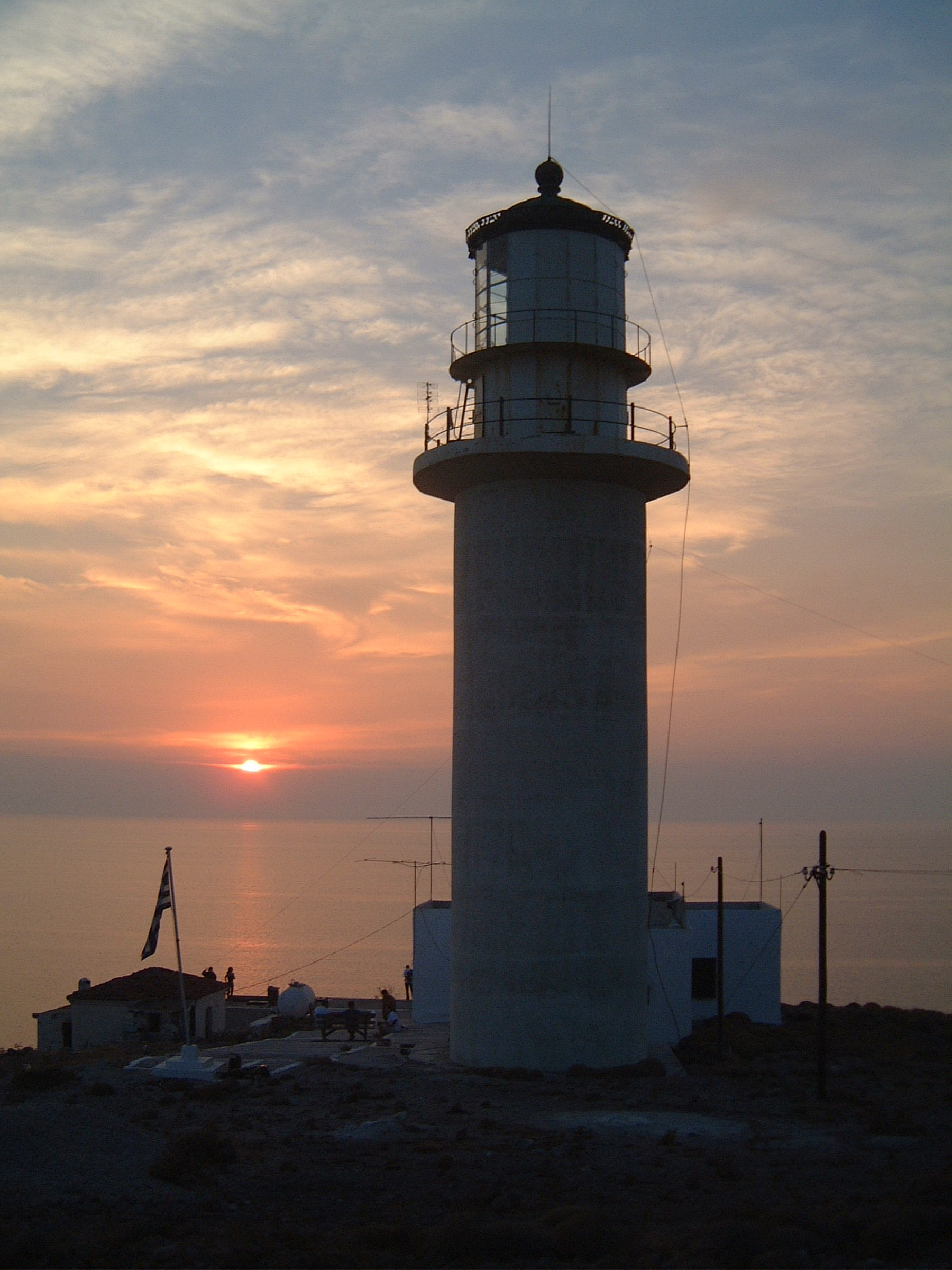
Megalonisi Lighthouse, Greece

The Megalonisi Lighthouse, also erroneously called the Sigri Lighthouse, is a lighthouse located on the island of Megalonisi (Nisiopi), c. 1.5 kilometres (0.93 mi) west of the village Sigri near the western tip of the Greek island of Lesbos. It is a circular tower standing 13.4 metres (44 ft) meters tall with its focal plane at a height of 53 metres (174 ft), and has an attached 1-storey keeper's house. The light was established in 1861 with oil as its energy source. The petroleum lantern was replaced by an electric light in 1989. The only time when the light was turned off was during the Second World War and it was repaired in 1945. It is still used today for navigation safety, and emits two white flashes every 15 seconds in a luminous range of 21 nautical miles.

== Gallery ==
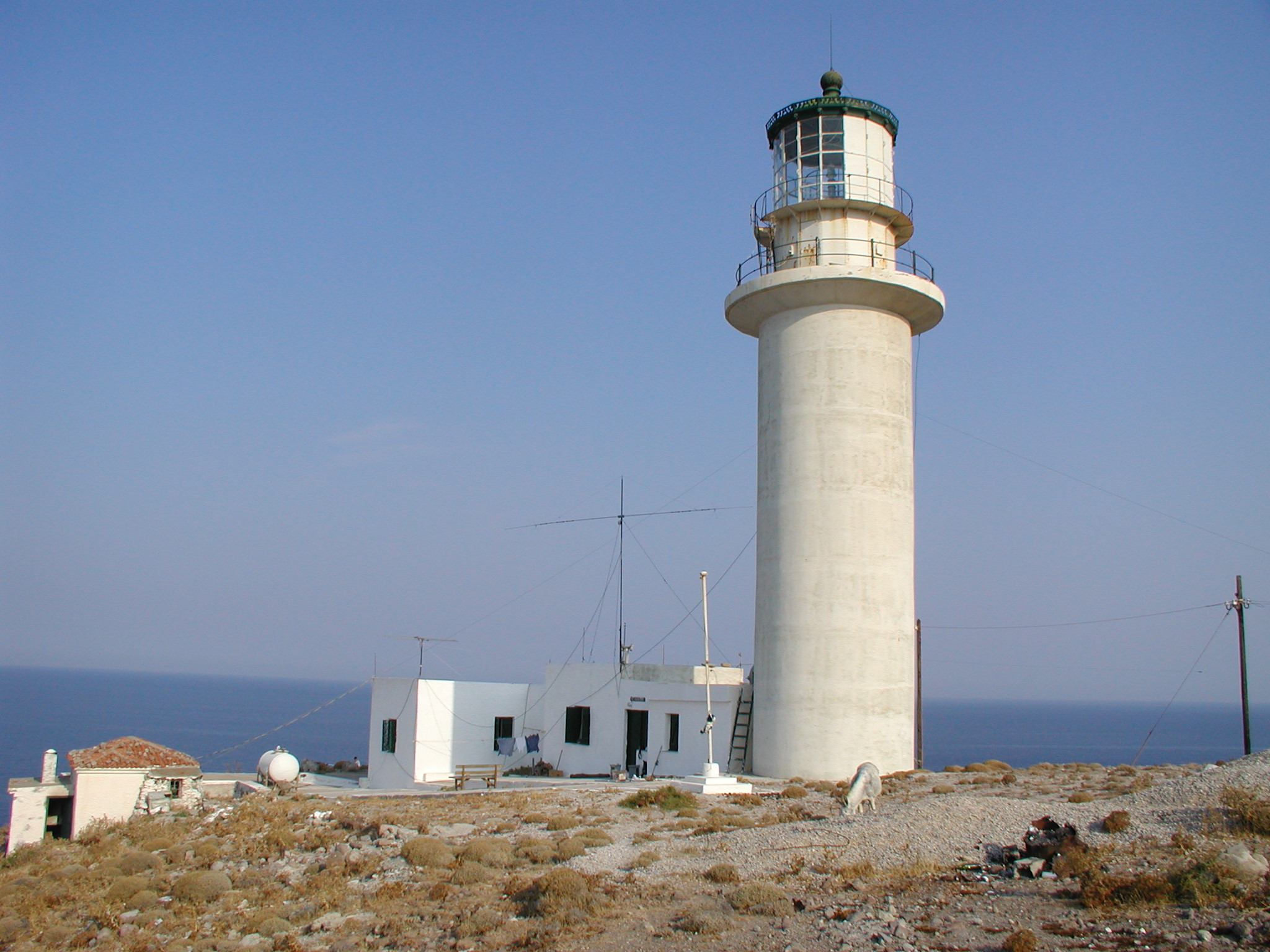
