= Megalonisi =

Island west of Lesbos, Greece

Native name: Μεγαλονήσι
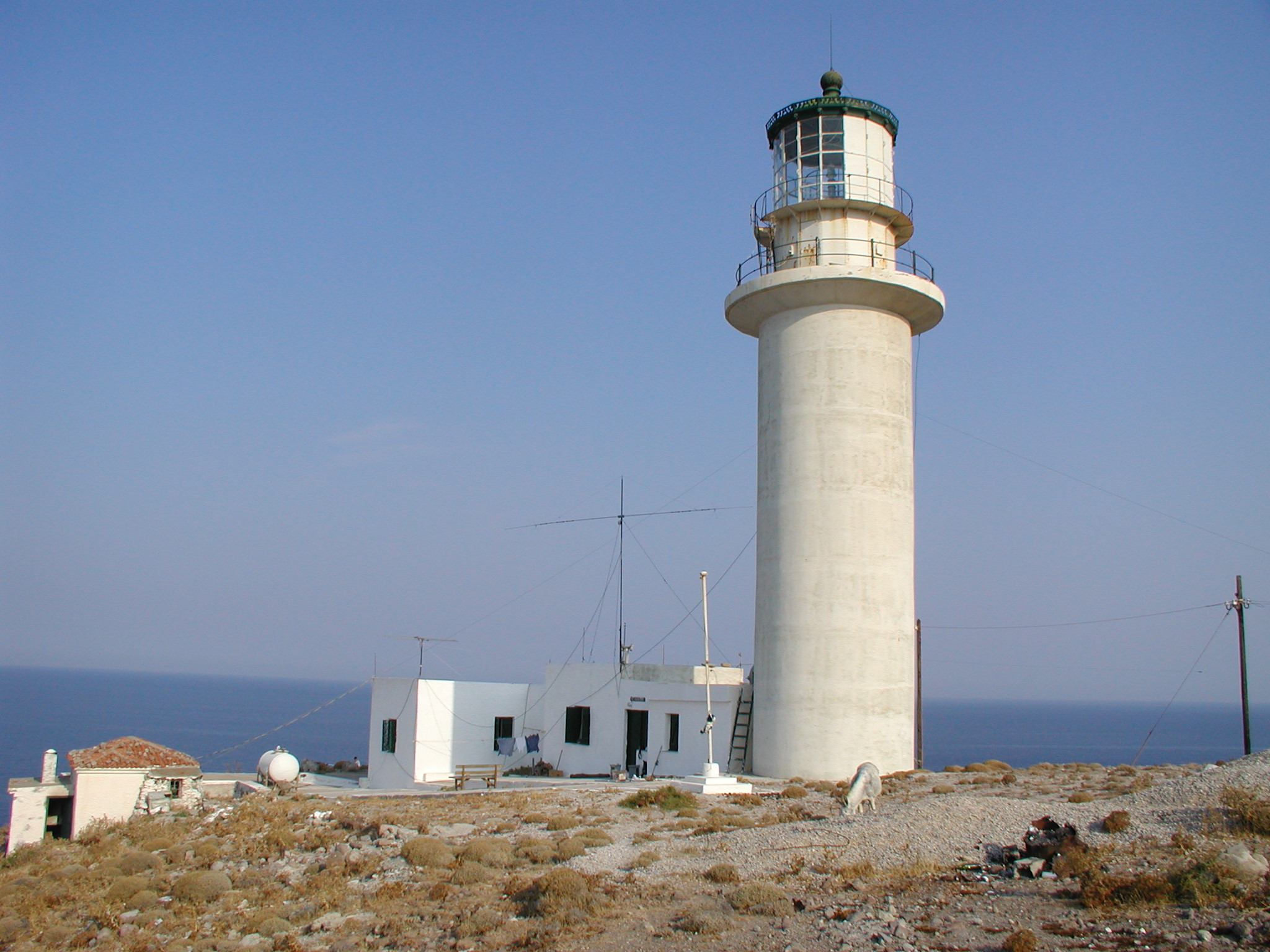
- Megalonisi Lighthouse
- Interactive map of Megalonisi

Geography
- Coordinates: 39.2164°N 25.8366°E
- Archipelago: Aegean Sea

Administration
- Greece

Megalonisi (Greek: Μεγαλονήσι), also Nisiopi (Greek: Νησιώπη), is a long island near the west coast of the island Lesbos, North Aegean, Greece. It is situated in front of Sigri's harbour, and stretches across the mouth of the bay and acts as a buffer to the prevailing winds. In the middle stands Megalonisi Lighthouse to help ships navigate in the rough east Aegean Sea.
