= Lesvos Petrified Forest =

Petrified wood forest found on the island of Lesbos, Greece

Coordinates: 39°12′13″N 25°52′28″E

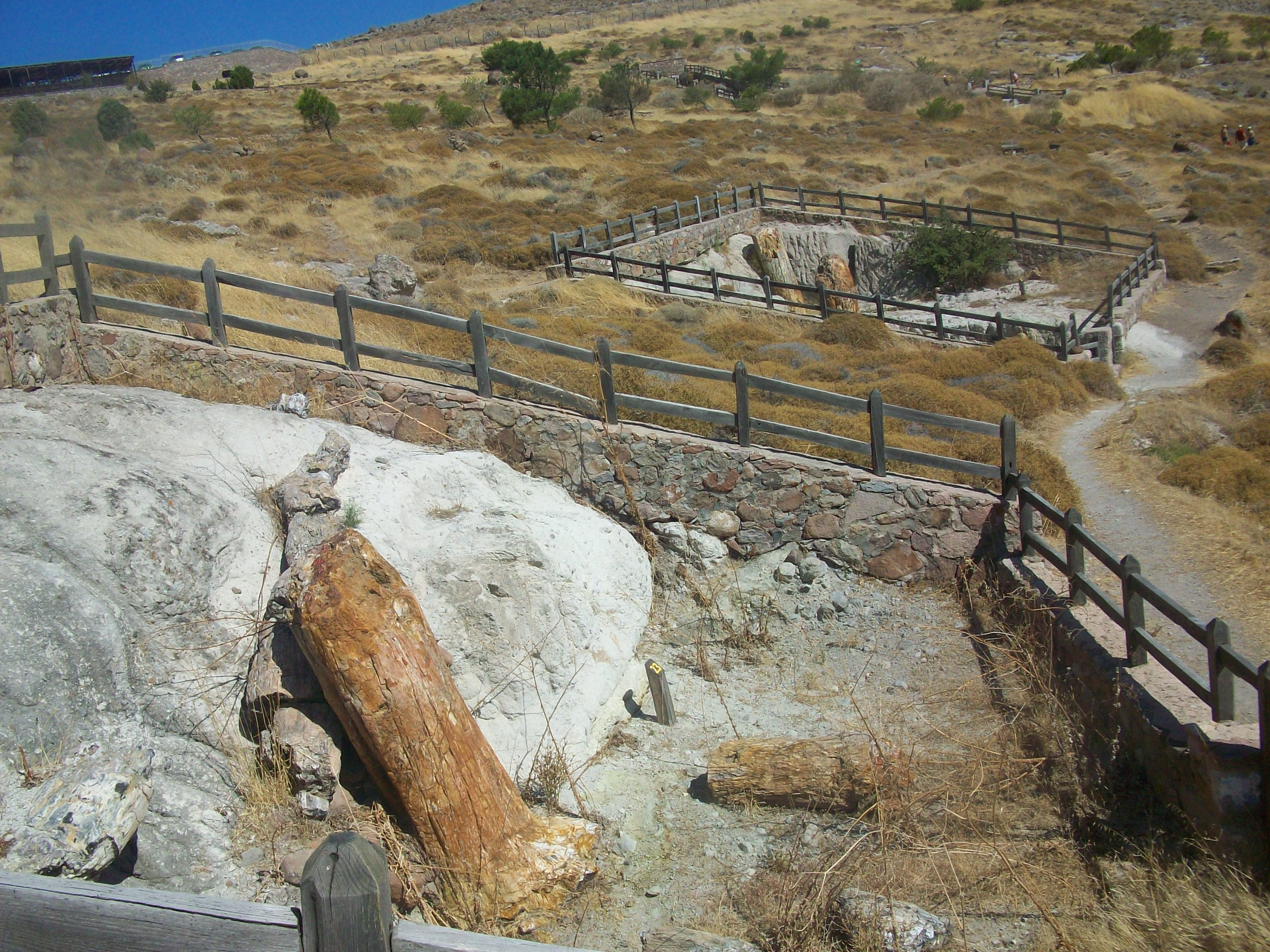
Lesvos Petrified Forest

The Lesvos Petrified Forest is a petrified wood forest on the island of Lesbos, Greece.

The forest was formed from the fossilized remains of plants and trees, which can be found in many localities on the western part of Lesvos Island. Finds now include a 19.5 metre tree complete with some roots and branches and leaves, as well as, 150 fossilised logs. The area enclosed by the villages of Eressos, Antissa and Sigri is very dense in fossilized tree trunks, and forms the area designated as the Petrified Forest of Lesbos, which is managed by the Natural History Museum of the Lesvos Petrified Forest, and has been designated as a protected natural monument. Isolated plant fossils can be found in many other parts of the island, including the villages of Molyvos, Polichnitos, Plomari and Akrasi. The forest is a major geosite of Lesvos Geopark.

== Formation ==
The petrified forest was formed by successive volcanic eruptions which took place between 17 and 20 million years ago, covering a large part of the island in lava and ash. The earliest forests show the vegetation, at the time of formation was subtropical, which differs from the present day Mediterranean vegetation. The Sigri pyroclastic formation is connected to the fossilization of the forest.

== Museum ==
There is a natural history museum associated with the petrified forest.

== Geoheritage designations ==
=== UNESCO World Heritage Site ===
The petrified forest of Lesbos, as of 2014, was proposed for UNESCO's Tentative List of World Heritage Sites.

=== IUGS geological heritage site ===
In respect of it having 'one of [the] most complete early Miocene forest ecosystem records of the world', the International Union of Geological Sciences (IUGS) included the 'Lesvos Early Miocene Petrified Forest' in its assemblage of 100 'geological heritage sites' around the world in a listing published in October 2022. The organisation defines an IUGS Geological Heritage Site as 'a key place with geological elements and/or processes of international scientific relevance, used as a reference, and/or with a substantial contribution to the development of geological sciences through history.'

== See also ==
- Lesbos
- Petrified Forest National Park
- Petrified forest of Evia, a similar petrified forest elsewhere in Greece
