= Natural History Museum of the Lesvos Petrified Forest =

Geological museum in Sigri, Greece

Coordinates: 39.2114°N 25.8548°E

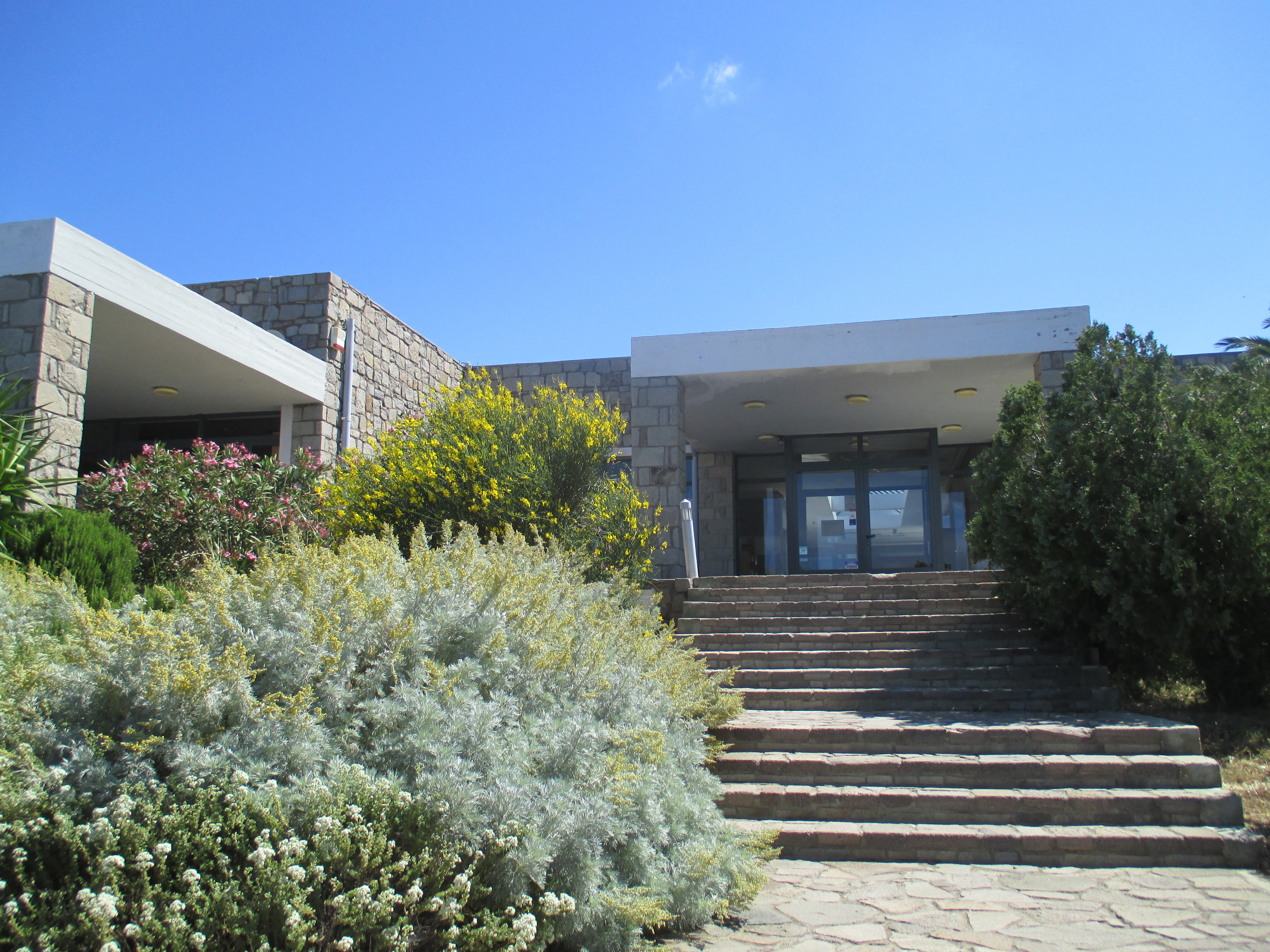
Museum entrance in 2014

The Natural History Museum of the Lesvos Petrified Forest (Greek: Μουσείο Φυσικής Ιστορίας Απολιθωμένου Δάσους Λέσβου) is a geological museum located in the village of Sigri on the island of Lesbos in Greece.

== Description ==
Established in 1994, it is a centre for the study, management, and preservation of the petrified forest of Lesbos and for public education about the site. It is a founding member of the European Geoparks Network and a member of UNESCO's Global Geoparks Network.

The museum's exhibitions are designed to educate visitors on the geological history and processes responsible for creating the petrified forest. These exhibits include petrified tree trunks, branches, roots, and leaves, offering insights into the rich biodiversity of Lesbos about 20 million years ago. The displays detail volcanic activity, fossilisation processes, and palaeoenvironmental conditions.

The museum also operates a research and conservation centre equipped with laboratories for palaeontological studies, allowing for the systematic investigation and preservation of fossils. Educational programmes and workshops aimed at schools and the general public focus on geology, environmental awareness, and natural history, promoting the sustainable development of the region.

The museum organises scientific conferences, seminars, and international collaborations to advance research and conservation efforts related to geological heritage.

== Excavation monitoring ==
The Natural History Museum of the Lesvos Petrified Forest employs advanced digital methods for monitoring and managing excavation processes in the petrified forest. The museum has incorporated augmented reality (AR) and three-dimensional (3D) geovisualisation tools to document and track the excavation of petrified tree trunks, enhancing both scientific accuracy and visitor engagement. Unmanned aerial systems (UAS), equipped with high-resolution 4K video capability, have been utilised at different excavation phases to create detailed cartographic and spatial models of the site.

The resulting 3D models, digital surface models, and orthophotomaps enable precise documentation of the spatial arrangement, orientation, and dimensions of the fossilised trunks, as well as changes in the excavation landscape over time. These tools also facilitate real-time, interactive experiences for museum visitors through AR applications that visualise excavation progress and geological data directly on mobile devices. An AR mobile application developed by the museum provides visitors with a dynamic way to explore detailed spatial and temporal data about the excavations. Users can interact with 3D visualisations of excavation sites, observe changes across different excavation periods, and obtain precise measurements and geographic contexts of the petrified findings.
