= Høydal =

Norwegian schooner

History

Norway
- Name: 1918–1924: Bjørg; 1924-1928: Høydal
- Owner: 1918: Thomas Juell, then O. N. Bugge; 1918-1924: A/S Gjølangers Rederi; 1924-1928: A/S Høydal
- Port of registry: Bergen
- Builder: Karlshamn Skeppsvarf, Karlshamn
- Completed: 1918
- Out of service: 25 November 1928
- Fate: Wrecked 1928

General characteristics
- Tonnage: 232 GRT, 139 NRT; 400 DWT
- Length: 107.8 ft (32.9 m)
- Beam: 25.2 ft (7.7 m)
- Depth: 11.4 ft (3.5 m)
- Installed power: 80 bhp Bolinder semi-diesel
- Sail plan: schooner

Høydal was a Norwegian three-masted auxiliary schooner, built in Sweden in 1918 as Bjørg. The ship owner was from Bergen. On 25 November 1928 she was wrecked at Texel, the Netherlands. The crew was rescued by a German ship.

== The ship ==
In 1918 the wood-hulled schooner Bjørg was built at Karlshamn, Sweden, by Karlshamn Skeppsvarf and given an 80 bhp auxiliary semi-diesel engine made by (J. & C. G. Bolinders in Stockholm. The ship measured 232 GRT and 139 NRT, with length of 107.8 ft (32.9 m), breadth 25.2 ft (7.7 m) and depth 11.4 ft (3.5 m). Her carrying capacity was 400 DWT.

Bjørg was completed on 12 October 1918 for Thomas Juell of Risør, Norway but, by the end of the year, had been sold on twice to Bergen owners, firstly to O. N. Bugge, and then to the comnpany A/S Gjølangers Rederi, managed by G. Rostrup. Management of the Gjølangers company passed in 1924 to Ole Hestenes of Gloppen Municipality, about 90 miles (140 km) north of Bergen, and the ship was renamed Høydal. From 1926 until the wrecking, the ship was managed by Karoline E. Hestenes.

== Fate ==
In November 1928, Høydal was on a voyage from Finland to France with a cargo of lumber. During a storm during the night of 24–25 November, off the Dutch coast, the ship hit Noorderhaaks island and was wrecked in the morning of 25 November 1928 at the beach of De Koog, at pole 21 of Texel. The ship was abandoned, and it seemed a mystery what had happened to the six crew members. Almost a week later, on 1 December, it became known that the crew was rescued. During the storm, despite the risk, the German ship Gunther came alongside, had taken the crew on board and carried them to Bremerhaven in Germany.

== Aftermath ==
The Høydal was severely damaged. The wreck on the beach had its cargo of a large batch of pine logs on board. C. Kuip from De Koog offered 625 Guilders for the wreck, but it was not accepted by the administrators.

The wooden cargo was sold. The shipowner from Bergen decided to salvage the anchor and chains and sell them. The auction at Hotel Texel on 11 January 1929 had a total revenue of 12,854 Guilders. The wreck was also auctioned and was bought for only 129 Guilders by H. Hin Jaczoon.

Remains of the wreck were still visible from the beach during the 1970s.
