= Sigri (village) =

Sigri Σίγρι
- Community
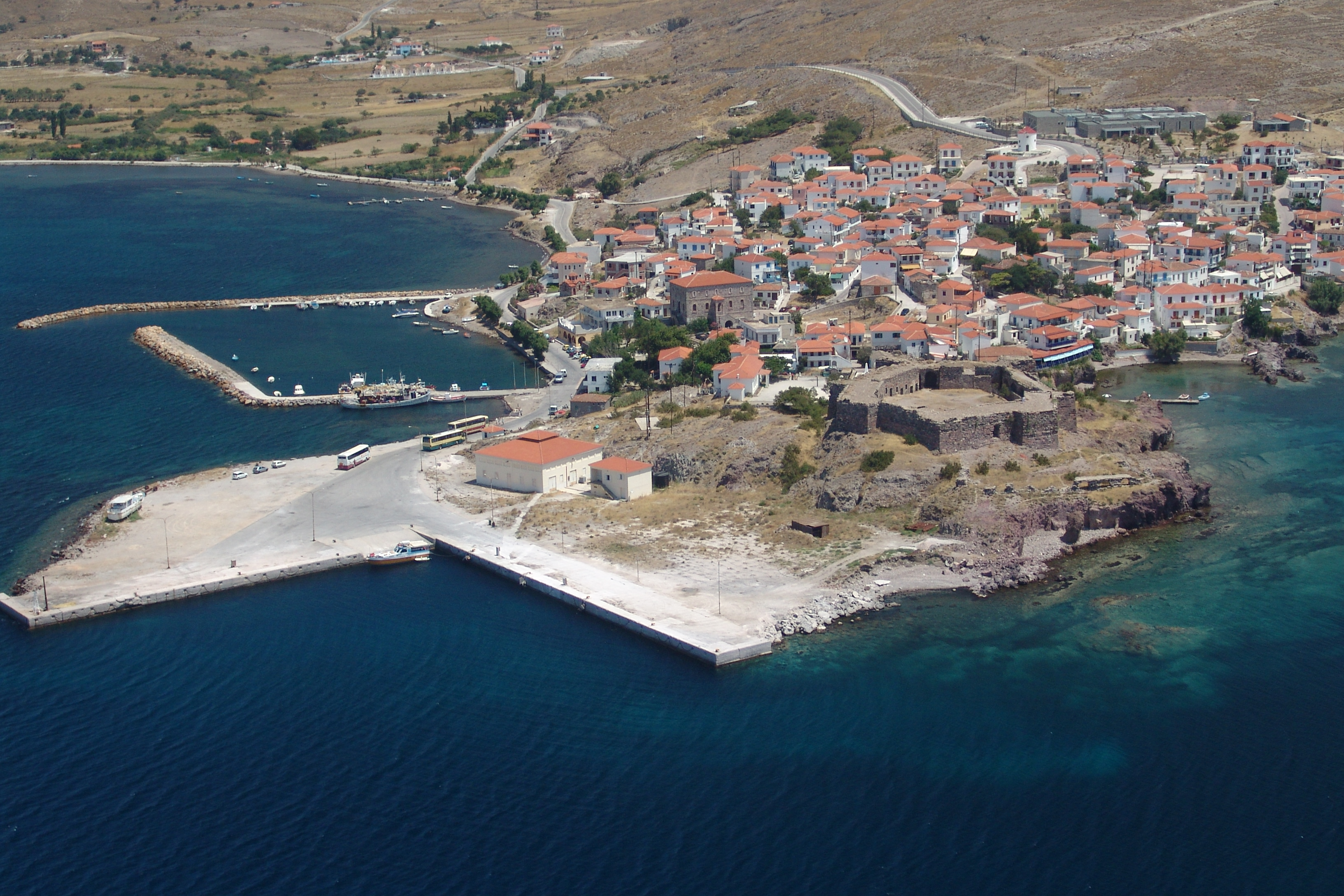
- Aerial view of Sigri with the castle

- Location within Greece
- Coordinates: 39°13′N 25°51′E
- Country: Greece
- Administrative region: North Aegean
- Regional unit: Lesbos
- Municipality: West Lesbos
- Municipal unit: Eresos-Antissa

Population (2021)
  - Community: 402
- Time zone: UTC+2 (EET)
  - Summer (DST): UTC+3 (EEST)

Sigri's harbour and the island of Nissiopi at sunset.

Sigri is a small fishing village near the western tip of Lesbos Island. Its name derives through Greek σίγουρος from the Venetian word siguro, meaning "safe", based on the fact that it has a safe harbour. Sigri has a Turkish castle, built in 1746 during the Ottoman occupation, which looks over the bay and the long island of Nissiopi, which stretches across the mouth of the bay and acts as a buffer to the prevailing winds. The port of Sigri is able to accommodate large vessels, even cruise ship-size ferry boats coming from the mainline. Almost all shipping to Lesbos, however, comes into the east of the island.

There are quite a number of restaurants, specialising naturally in fish, but also in the local delicacies such as a type of spinach, called horta, which is boiled and served with lemon and salt.

== The Natural History Museum of the Lesvos ==
The Natural History Museum of the Lesvos Petrified Forest was founded in 1994 aiming to the study, research, promotion, exhibition, conservation and protection of the Petrified forest of Lesbos. It is a legal non-profit entity and is overseen by the Ministry of Culture and Sports. The museum is located in Sigri in western Lesvos, in the center of the protected area of the Petrified Forest, a protected natural monument with worldwide recognition.

The exhibitions of the museum include two permanent exhibition halls. The first is dedicated to the Petrified Forest and the evolution of plants on earth, which is presented through rare fossils, from the first single-celled organisms that appeared on Earth until the appearance of grown plants and the creation of the Petrified Forest. The flora of the Petrified Forest is presented with more than forty different species. Petrified pieces of trunks, branches, roots, seeds and leaves are presented in front of large graphs of the plants. In the second hall the “Evolution of the Aegean” presents through impressive models and charts geological phenomena and processes associated with the creation of the Petrified Forest and the geological history of the Aegean's basin in the last 20 million years. Visitors are introduced to the evolutionary history of the volcanic activity in the Greek area, impressive forms of quartz minerals and rocks, skulls moulders of significant extinct primates from Greece and Lesvos, and tools made of flint from the Stone Age.

The visitors can watch the recording of earthquakes in real time by the seismological station of Sigri. The museum is a tool for cultural, economic and social development of the region. Every year international conferences, exhibitions, lectures and various events take place. Furthermore, at the premises of the museum the Agrotourism Festival is organized. Particular attention has been given to the implementation of educational programs and the creation of educational materials for all levels. The museum's educational programs attract each year interest from students of Lesvos and the rest of Greece or abroad. The museum has installed an earthquake simulator that recreates earthquakes that happened in the past. The earthquake simulator provides a realistic experience of earthquakes to the museum's visitors, in order to understand the phenomenon and to have a proper training on how to counter seismic risk. The museum collaborates with the Global Geoparks Network of UNESCO, the European Geoparks Network, with scientific institutions, museums, universities and research centers from Greece and abroad.

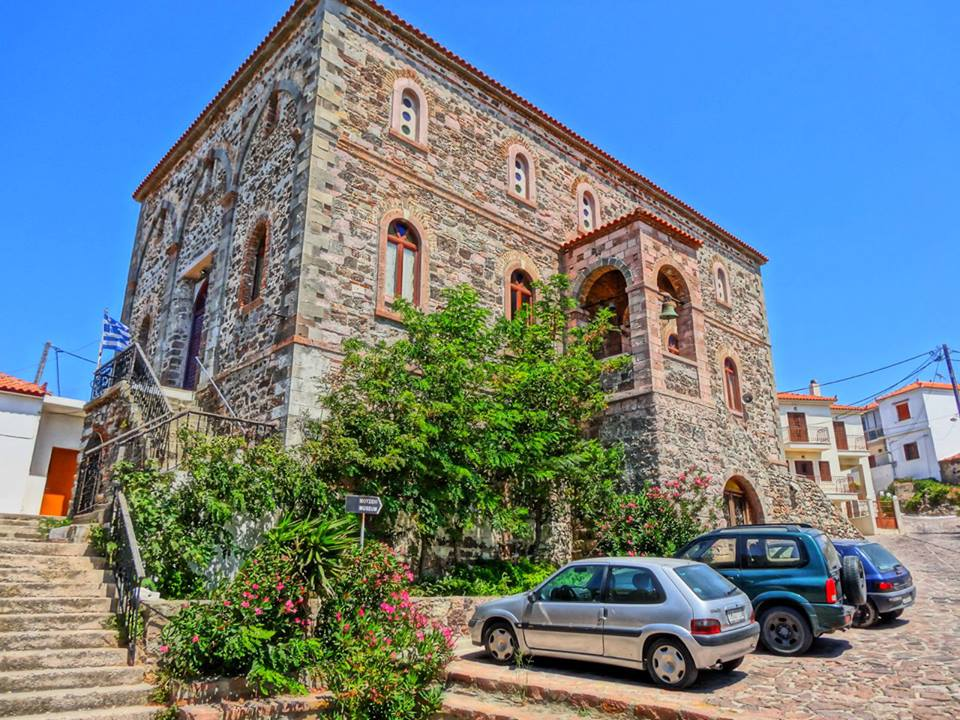
Old building

This is the dry end of the island of Lesbos fairly lacking in vegetation and agriculture. Its beaches have the most sand of all of Lesbos, contrasting with the rockier and pebble beaches to the east. This area is sparsely populated and only frequented by a small number of tourists. It is quite windy relative to east Lesbos, but has not yet been discovered by wind surfers. The sea is not that safe, although within the large bays the waves and currents are gentle.

The village beach, a near-180 degree sweep of volcanic grey sand, is normally safe for children, shelving gently out to the rocky floor of the shallow bay. Inflatables should be tethered, or their users closely supervised, because of the breeze. There are six clothes-optional sandy beaches within walking distance of Sigri.
