= Lesbos Prefecture =

Coordinates: 39°10′N 26°20′E

Lesbos Prefecture Νομός Λέσβου
- Former prefecture
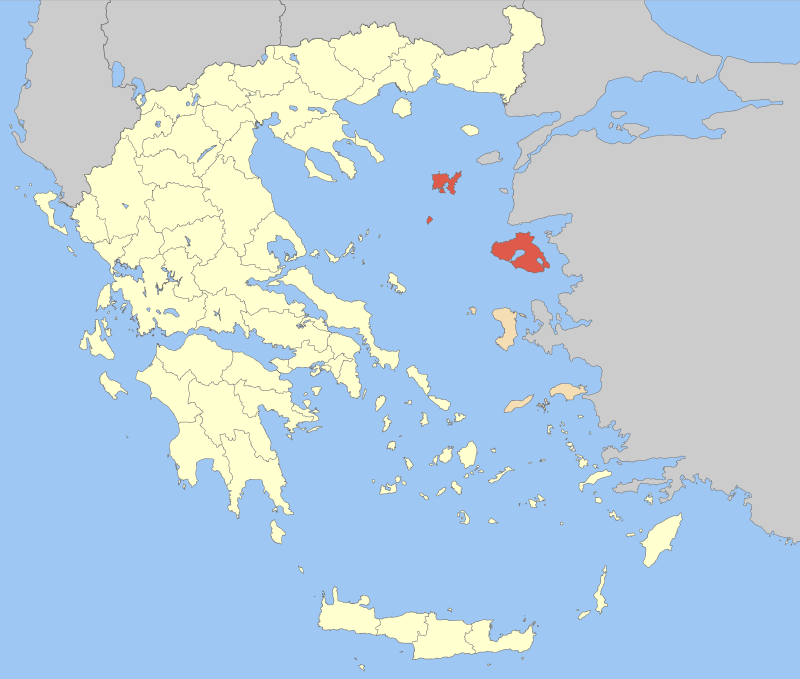
- Location of Lesbos in Greece

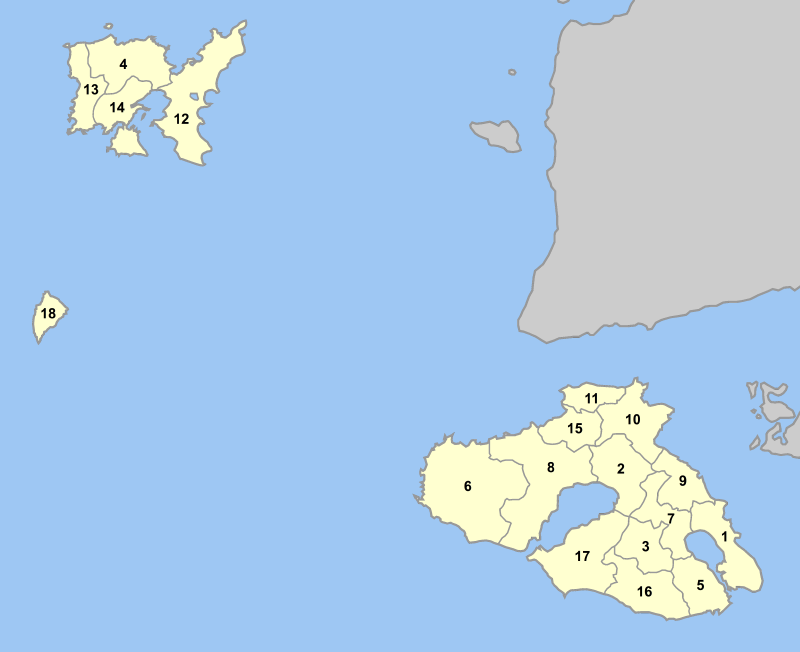
- Location of municipalities within Lesbos Prefecture
- Country: Greece
- Periphery: North Aegean
- Capital: Mytilene
- Subdivisions: List: 4 provinces; 17 municipalities; 1 community

Area
  - Total: 2,154 km^{2} (832 sq mi)
  - Rank: 31st

Population (2005)
  - Total: 110,220
  - Rank: 32nd
  - Density: 51.17/km^{2} (132.5/sq mi)
  - Rank: 29th
- Postal codes: 81x xx
- Area codes: 225x0
- ISO 3166 code: GR-83
- Vehicle registration: ΜΗ (Lemnos), ΜΥ (Lesbos)

Lesbos Prefecture (Greek: Νομός Λέσβου) was one of the prefectures of Greece. It comprised three main islands: Lesbos itself, Lemnos, and the smaller island of Agios Efstratios. Its capital was the town of Mytilene, on Lesbos. In 2011 the prefecture was abolished and the territory was divided between the regional units of Lesbos and Lemnos.

== Places ==
- Mytilene, the capital city of the island and the prefecture itself.
- Kalloni, the central town of the island of Lesbos.
- Agia Paraskevi, on the island of Lesbos.
- Eressos, on the island of Lesbos.
- Myrina, capital town of the island of Limnos.
- Agios Efstratios, on the homonymous isle.

== Provinces ==
- Province of Lemnos – Myrina
- Province of Mithymna – Mithymna
- Province of Mytilene – Mytilene
- Province of Plomari – Plomari

Note: Provinces no longer hold any legal status in Greece.

== Municipalities and communities ==
Municipality	YPES code	Seat (if different)	Postal code	Area code
Agia Paraskevi	3501		811 02	22520-3
Agiasos	3502		811 01	22520-2
Atsiki	3504		814 01	22530
Eresos-Antissa	3506	Eresos	814 01	22530-8
Evergetoulas	3507	Sykounta	811 05	22520-9
Gera	3505	Pappados	811 06	22510-8
Kalloni	3508		811 07	22530-2
Loutropoli Thermis	3509	Thermi	811 00	22510-7
Mantamados	3510		811 04	22530-6
Mithymna	3511		811 07; 811 08	2220-7
Moudros	3512		814 01	22520-7
Myrina	3513		814 00	22540-2
Mytilene	3514		811 00	22510-2 through 7
Nea Koutali	3515	Kontias	814 00	22540-5
Petra	3516		811 09	22530
Plomari	3517		812 00	22530-3
Polichnitos	3518		813 00	22520-4
Community	YPES code	Seat (if different)	Postal code	Area code
Agios Efstratios	3503		815 00	22540-9

== See also ==
- Aeolic Greek
- List of settlements in Lesbos
- List of settlements in the Lemnos regional unit
