= Livadochori, Lemnos =

Livadochori Λιβαδοχώρι
- Community
- Location within Greece
- Coordinates: 39°55′N 25°12′E
- Country: Greece
- Administrative region: North Aegean
- Regional unit: Lemnos
- Municipality: Lemnos
- Municipal unit: Nea Koutali

Population (2021)
  - Community: 327
- Time zone: UTC+2 (EET)
  - Summer (DST): UTC+3 (EEST)

Livadochori (Greek: Λιβαδοχώρι) is a village and a community in the Greek island of Lemnos, part of the municipal unit Nea Koutali. The community includes the village Poliochni. It is situated in the central part of the island, 1 km northwest of Kallithea, 2 km north of Nea Koutali, 7 km northwest of Moudros and 12 km northeast of Myrina. The Lemnos International Airport is 3 km east.

== Population ==
Year	Settlement population	Community population
1928	516	-
1951	604	-
1981	266	-
1991	155	-
2001	210	474
2011	237	373
2021	219	327

== History ==
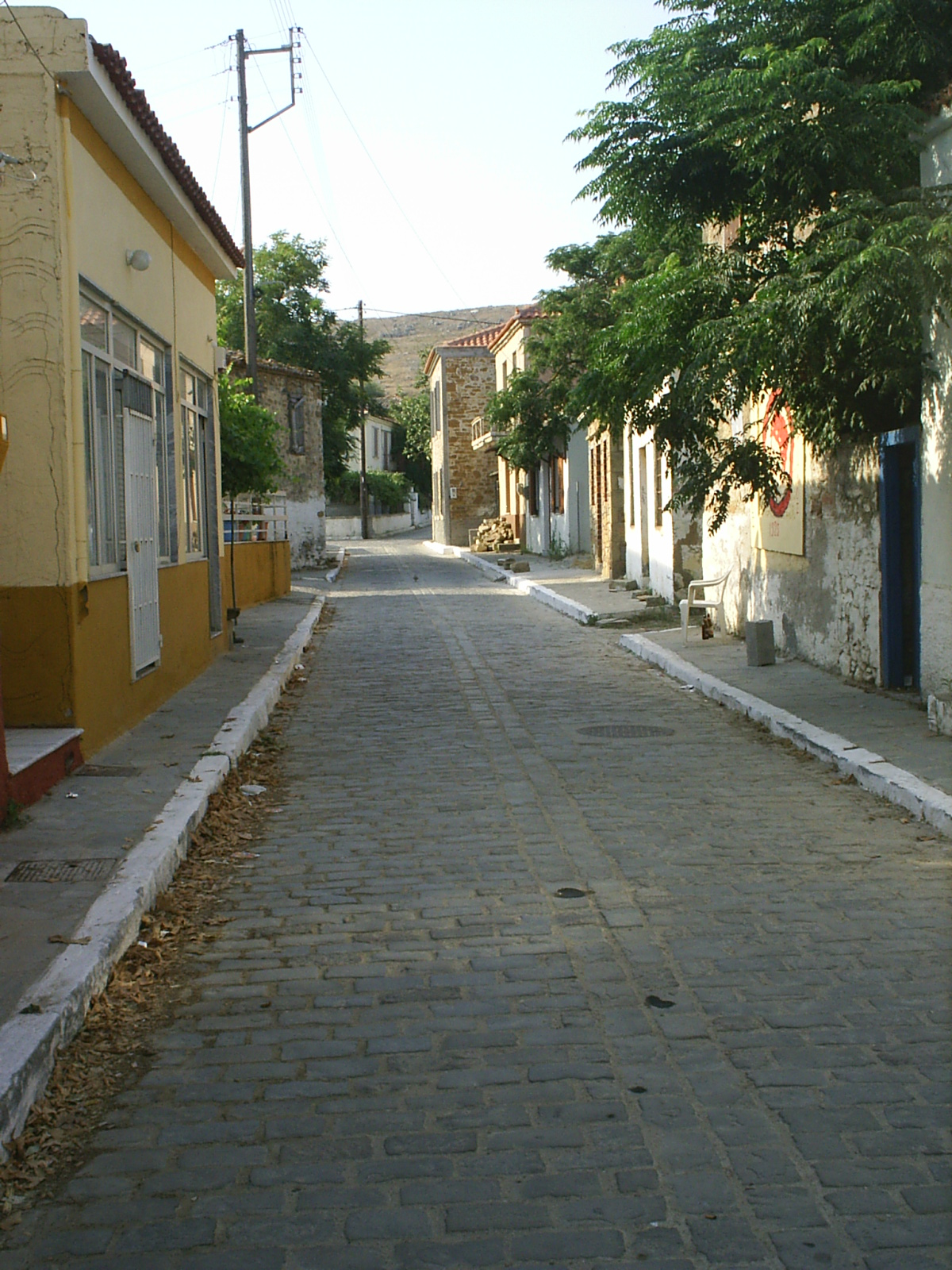
A street

Under the name Livadochorion or Livatochorion it was first mentioned in 1355 in a document of the Philotheou monastery, Mount Athos. Since then it has repeatedly been mentioned under the same name in maps (including Buondelmonti's map in 1418) and books, suggesting continuous existence of the village. During the years under Ottoman rule, it was one of the main villages on the island. It was populated by Greeks and agas who supervised their agricultural estates. In 1548, when Belon visited the island, the village was fortified and the seat of the voivode of the island. The revolutionary leaders Pantelis Marinakis and Apostolis Limnios came from the village, and took part in the battles in Arcadia and Niokastro in 1824 and 1825 under Vasos Mavrovouniotis.

When the German archaeologist Conze visited the village in 1858, it was still a large village that was partly ruined. At that time Greek shipowners and immigrants began to buy the Ottoman estates and the Ottoman landowners began to settle in the capital Kastro. According to the communal archives from 1854, the village had 62 enlisted men that paid 989 piastres to avoid conscription. It had 45 Christian families in 1863 and 55 in 1874, it had 59 houses in the same year. The village was part of the municipality (koli) of Kontias and its inhabitantas sent a representative to the Lemnos provincial assembly.

A school was founded by Doukas Palaiologos in nearby Sarpi in 1868. In 1894 a school was established in Livadochori. In 1910 a dedicated school building was built by Egyptian-Greeks Sarantis and Palaiologos from Kornos and the school was community-run. It ran up to the 1980s and closed due to a student population decline.

After Livadochori and the island joined the rest of Greece as a result of the Balkan Wars, it became an independent community in 1918, in which it was united for some years with the settlements of Strati (repealed in 1928) and Kourouni (since 1940 a part of the community of Lera).

In the years between the two World Wars, the village saw a small growth. It built an aqueduct and a fountain in 1922, donated for 200,000 drachmas by the brothers Nikolaos and Komninos Halamandaris. It had 516 inhabitantas in 1928, among whom were many refugees from Minor Asia, employed mainly in the agriculture and animal husbandry. In its fields, it produced 480,000 tons of wheat and 30,000 tons of cotton. It had a flour mill and a cotton factory.

After the Second World War, the village declined dramatically due to emigration. It had 604 inhabitants in 1951, it fell to 266 in 1981 (of which 63 were inhabitants of neighboring Poliochni). Together with Poliochni, Livadochori had 373 inhabitants in 2011. In 1989, the Livadochori High school was opened which serves students from central Lemnos.

== Poliochni ==
Poliochni is a village on a low hill northeast of Livadochori. It takes its name from this hill, and is not related to the archaeological site Poliochne in eastern Lemnos. In the Middle Ages, a village called Agiopavlitiko was situated on the site of present Poliochni. In a document dated 1796, this village was mentioned under the name Ligkouli or Likoli. By then, it was already abandoned and ruined. In 1881 the place was mentioned as Polichni, which was changed into Poliochni after the discovery of ancient Poliochne near Kaminia. It was settled again in the early 20th century, and since in 1981 it is an official settlement of the community Livadochori.

== See also ==
- List of settlements in the Lemnos regional unit

== Sources ==
- Tourptsoglou-Stefanidou Vasiliki, Voyages and Geographical Sources From Lemnos Island (15th-20th Centuries) (Ταξιδιωτικά και γεωγραφικά κείμενα για τη νήσο Λήμνο (15ος-20ος αιώνας))
- Belitsos, Theodoros, Lemnos and its villages, 1994.
- Lemnos Province CD ROM (Cdrom Επαρχείου Λήμνου): Lovable Lemnos
- Belitsos, Theodoros: Historic route in Lemnos: Livadochori, Lemnos Newspapers, p 531 (June 10, 2008).
