= Pedino, Lemnos =

Pedino Πεδινό
- Community
- Location within Greece
- Coordinates: 39°53′N 25°11′E
- Country: Greece
- Administrative region: North Aegean
- Regional unit: Lemnos
- Municipality: Lemnos
- Municipal unit: Nea Koutali

Population (2021)
  - Community: 157
- Time zone: UTC+2 (EET)
  - Summer (DST): UTC+3 (EEST)

Pedino (Greek: Πεδινό) is a community on the Greek island of Lemnos, Greece. It consists of the villages Vounaria, Neo Pedino and Palaio Pedino, and the uninhabited island Alogonisi. It is part of the municipal unit of Nea Koutali.

== Geography ==
Pedino is situated in the central part of the island of Lemnos, west of the gulf of Moudros. It is 1.5 km southwest of Nea Koutali, 1 km northeast of Portianou and 11 km east of Myrina. The small uninhabited island Alogonisi, in the gulf of Moudros, has an area of 286 hectares and a perimeter of 2,895 m.

== Population ==
Year	(Palaio) Pedino	Neo Pedino	Vounaria	Total
1991	14	104	280	398
2001	5	108	218	331
2011	14	161	93	268
2021	22	112	23	157

== History ==
Under the older name Pesperagou (Πεσπεράγου), the village was mentioned in the late 14th century. The origin of the name is unknown. One theory is that it could come from a Turkish landowner named Pesper-Aga. But the name predates the Turkish invasion of Lemnos. In 1955 Pesperagou was renamed to Pedino after the plain in which the village is built.

In 1856, Pesperagou had 57 men who paid 782 piastres to avoid conscription. The village had 40 families in 1863 and 37 in 1874. In the same year, it had 44 homes and was part of the municipality (koli) of Kontias. Between 1918 and 1921, hundreds of Russian émigrés were settled in the area between Pedino and Portianou. They lived under harsh conditions, and 292 people died during the influenza epidemic of 1920-21. They are buried in a Russian-Cossack cemetery by the coast.

Pesperagou became a separate community in 1919. Its population began to rise, it had 230 inhabitants in 1928 and 300 (with 60 houses) in 1938. Its inhabitants produced wheat and cotton.

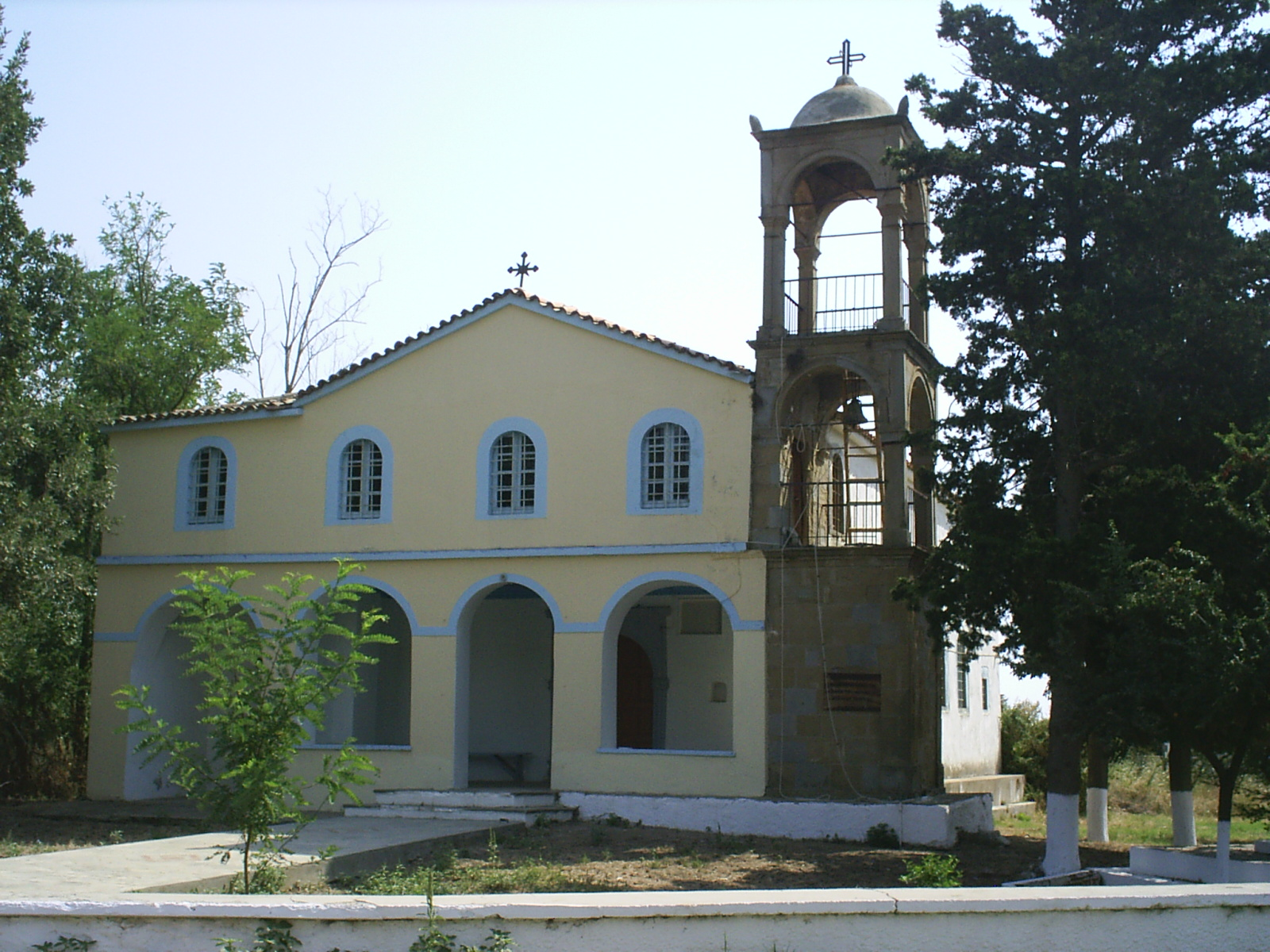
Church Agiou Ioanni Prodromou in Neo Pedino

The islands of Lemnos and Agios Efstratios were struck by a severe earthquake in February 1968. The old village of Pedino (now Palaio Pedino) was destroyed by the earthquake, and most inhabitants were resettled in the new village Neo Pedino, built nearby.

== See also ==
- List of settlements in the Lemnos regional unit
