= List of settlements in the Lemnos regional unit =

This is a list of settlements in Lemnos regional unit in Greece:

- Agios Dimitrios
- Agios Efstratios
- Agkaryones
- Atsiki
- Dafni
- Fisini
- Kalliopi
- Kallithea
- Kaminia
- Karpasi
- Kaspakas
- Katalakko
- Kontias
- Kontopouli
- Kornos
- Livadochori
- Lychna
- Moudros
- Myrina
- Nea Koutali
- Pedino
- Panagia
- Plaka
- Platy
- Portianou
- Repanidi
- Romanou
- Roussopouli
- Sardes
- Skandali
- Thanos
- Tsimandria
- Varos

== By municipality ==
Agios Efstratios (no subdivisions)

== See also ==
- List of towns and villages in Greece
