= Agkaryones =

Agkaryones Αγκαρυώνες
- Community
- Location within Greece
- Coordinates: 39°54′N 25°11′E
- Country: Greece
- Administrative region: North Aegean
- Regional unit: Lemnos
- Municipality: Lemnos
- Municipal unit: Nea Koutali

Population (2021)
  - Community: 110
- Time zone: UTC+2 (EET)
  - Summer (DST): UTC+3 (EEST)

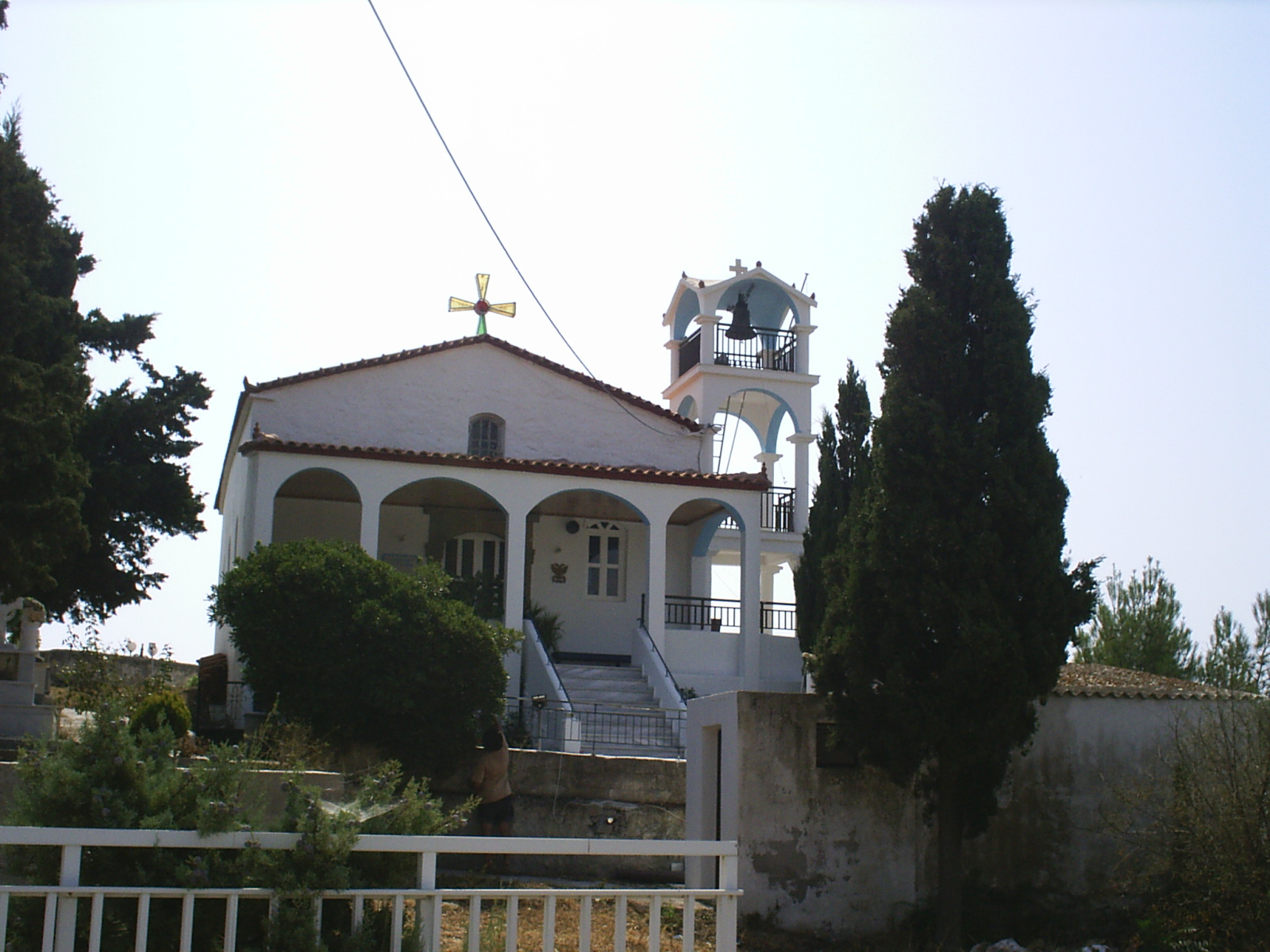
The church of St. George in the village of Agkaryones, Lemnos.

Agkaryones (Greek: Αγκαρυώνες, before 1940: Αγγαριώνες - Angariones) is a village in the Greek island of Lemnos, part of the municipal unit Nea Koutali. It is situated in the western part of the island, 1.5 km north of Portianou, 2 km west of Nea Koutali, 4 km northeast of Kontias, 4 km west of the Lemnos Airport and 10 km east of Myrina.

== Population ==
Year	Population
1920	15
1935	45
1950	242
1960	202
1981	135
1991	153
2001	138
2011	116
2021	110

== History ==
The village was first mentioned in 1396 in a codex of the Pantokratoros monastery as "Kariones". The German traveller Conze knew it as "Agrionis" in 1858. The strategic location of the village on a hill over the bay of Moudros made it very suitable as an observation point for the Byzantines. On the small hill "Paliokastro" there were watchtowers, used during the Orlov Revolt, that were known as the "Angariones Vigles". The name probably refers to "angaron pyr", the fire that the watchmen used to send signals.

Until the 20th century, Angariones has always been a very small village, with some farms and a small church of St. George. There were 25 families in 1862, it slowly rose to 28 in 1874. It was part of the community of Kontias. In 1928 it became an independent community with only 15 inhabitants, but the population grew with the arrival of refugees and landless people. It had 45 inhabitants in 1935. A water supply with a beautiful fountain was built, trees were planted and a school was opened. Cotton cultivation brought significant growth in the 1940s and 1950s, and the population reached its peak at 242 in 1951. It declined again due to emigration, and in 2011 its population was 116.

== See also ==
- List of settlements in the Lemnos regional unit

== Sources ==
- Tourptsoglou-Stefanidou Vasiliki, Travels and Geographical Texts From Lemnos Island (15th-20th Centuries) (Ταξιδιωτικά και γεωγραφικά κείμενα για τη νήσο Λήμνο (15ος-20ος αιώνας))
- Belitsos, Theodoros, Lemnos and its villages by Th. Belitsos 1994.
- Lemnos Province CD Rom (Cdrom Επαρχείου Λήμνου): Lovable Lemnos
