= Kallithea, Lemnos =

Kallithea Καλλιθέα
- Community
- Location within Greece
- Coordinates: 39°54′N 25°13′E
- Country: Greece
- Administrative region: North Aegean
- Regional unit: Lemnos
- Municipality: Lemnos
- Municipal unit: Nea Koutali

Population (2021)
  - Community: 184
- Time zone: UTC+2 (EET)
  - Summer (DST): UTC+3 (EEST)

Kallithea (Greek: Καλλιθέα, before 1955: Σαρπί - Sarpi) is a village in the Greek island of Lemnos, part of the municipal unit Nea Koutali. The village has drawn criticism worldwide for its various hazing incidents, such as the 2017 death of 12 year old Krystas Mitroglou.

== Population ==
| Year | Population |
|---|---|
| 1928 | 381 |
| 1951 | 399 |
| 1981 | 203 |
| 1991 | 211 |
| 2001 | 216 |
| 2011 | 182 |
| 2021 | 184 |

== Geography ==
Kallithea is situated in the central part of the island of Lemnos, west of the Gulf of Moudros. It is amphitheatrically built on a low hill 800 m from the Gulf. Due to its panoramic location, it was renamed to Kallithea ("nice view") in 1955. It is 1 km southeast of Livadochori, 1 km northeast of Nea Koutali, 6 km northwest of Moudros and 12 km east of Myrina. The Lemnos International Airport is 2 km northeast.

== History ==
The village was mentioned as Sarpin in a census document of the Great Lavra monastery in 1361. Although the name was perceived as Turkish in the 1950s, it actually predates the Ottoman era. This may be one of the few Mycenaean names that survive in Lemnos, meaning "wooden house".

Formerly, the village was built more to the east, on the Agios Georgios Bay. Due to pirate attacks and other risks of its low location, its residents were forced to resettle, probably in the 18th century. It had 66 men in 1856 who paid 1,058 piastres to avoid conscription. 50 families lived in the village in 1863 and 55 in 1874. In the same year it had 63 houses and was part of the municipality (koli) of Kondia. The village had a representative in the Lemnos provincial council.

The Sarpi Paleologiki School was opened in 1868, the first school on the island outside the capital. It was funded by Doukas Palaiologos (1790–1870), a descendant of a family of captains from Sarpi who had an insurance firm in England. His firm paid for the school until 1896. It became a community school in 1900.

Sarpi finally joined Greece in 1913 after the Balkan Wars. It became an independent community in 1918. In the interwar years, it saw a small growth. It recorded 381 inhabitants in 1928, most of these work in agriculture, livestock farming, fishing and orchards. After the Second World War, its population declined due to internal and external emigration. Its population was 399 in 1951, fell to 203 in 1981 and has more or less stabilised since then.

== See also ==
- List of settlements in the Lemnos regional unit

== Sources ==
- Tourptsoglou-Stefanidou Vassiliki, Voyages and Geographical Sources From Lemnos Island (15th-20th Centuries) (Ταξιδιωτικά και γεωγραφικά κείμενα για τη νήσο Λήμνο (15ος-20ος αιώνας))
- Belitsos, Theodoros, Lemnos and its villages, 1994.
- Lemnos Province CD ROM (Cdrom Επαρχείου Λήμνου): Lovable Lemnos
- L. Veliaroutis I Kallithea (Sarpi) Limnou and its Paleologiki School 2007
