= Tsimandria =

Tsimandria Τσιμάνδρια
- Community
- Location within Greece
- Coordinates: 39°52′N 25°10′E
- Country: Greece
- Administrative region: North Aegean
- Regional unit: Lemnos
- Municipality: Lemnos
- Municipal unit: Nea Koutali

Population (2021)
  - Community: 236
- Time zone: UTC+2 (EET)
  - Summer (DST): UTC+3 (EEST)

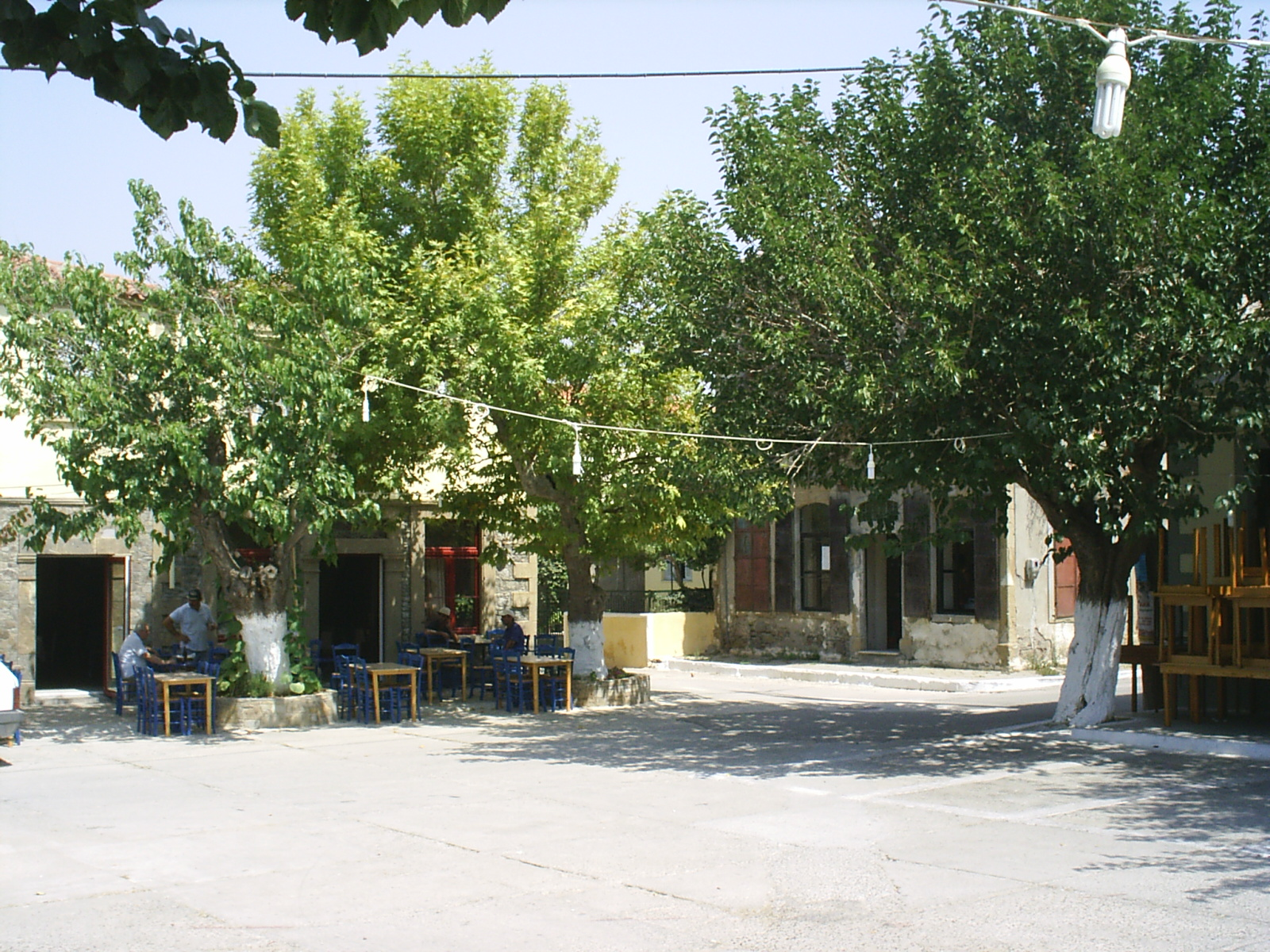
Picture of the town

Tsimandria (Greek: Τσιμάνδρια) is a village and a community in the southwestern part of Lemnos, a Greek island in the northern part of the Aegean Sea. It is part of the municipal unit of Nea Koutali. It is 1.5 km south of Portianou, 2 km east of Kontias, 4 km southwest of Nea Koutali and 10 km east of Myrina. The eastern half of the Fakos peninsula and the islets Kastria and Kompi are part of the community.

== Population ==
Year	Population
1918	720
1951	700
1981	308
1991	292
2001	314
2011	259
2021	236

== History ==
From the late Byzantine period, there has been a monastery in the area of Tsimandria, known as "Pteris" or "Fteri". Since the 14th century it was a dependency of the Monastery of Saint John the Theologian on Patmos. The fate of the monastery after the Ottoman conquest is not precisely known: on the 1785 map by Choiseul-Gouffier a monastery was marked, but Conze only found ruins in 1858. Two chapels, of the Taxiarches (i.e. the archangels Gabriel and Michael) and of Saint John the Theologian, remain.

The village was first mentioned in 1569 as "Semandra". Other older versions of the name are "Smandria" and "Tzimandra". The village is built in a protected location behind the Filonikos hill. In 1856, it had 122 men who paid 1,909 piastres to escape conscription. It recorded 73 families in 1863 which rose slowly to 80 in 1874. The village had 96 houses in 1874. It was part of the municipality of Kontias. The village had a representative in the island council. Apart from rural occupations, there were also sailors.

On 8 October 1812, it was the first village in Lemnos that was liberated by the Greek Army that landed on the nearby coast of Vourlidia. In 1915 it hosted many soldiers from the United Kingdom and its colonies that participated in the failed Gallipoli Campaign, and from 1918 until 1921 Russian refugees, both soldiers of Wrangel's army and citizens.

In 1918, Tsimandria became a community. Between the two World Wars, the village experienced growth. It had 720 inhabitants and 120 houses. The school was extended, and a covered fountain was built in 1935 by the square. The cultivation of cotton was started, and a cultural society that promotes traditional music, songs and dances of Lemnos. The last living link with the past is the lyre player Thanasis Kotsinadellis. As the rest of Lemnos, Tsimandria lost a large part of the population due to emigration. From 700 inhabitants in 1951, it declined to 259 in 2011.

== Diapori ==
The small port Diapori is situated at the west side of the sandy isthmus that connects the Fakos peninsula with the rest of Lemnos. It is 2 km south of Tsimandria. There are a few small shipyards and taverns.

== See also ==
- List of settlements in the Lemnos regional unit
