= Fisini =

Fisini Φισίνη
- Community
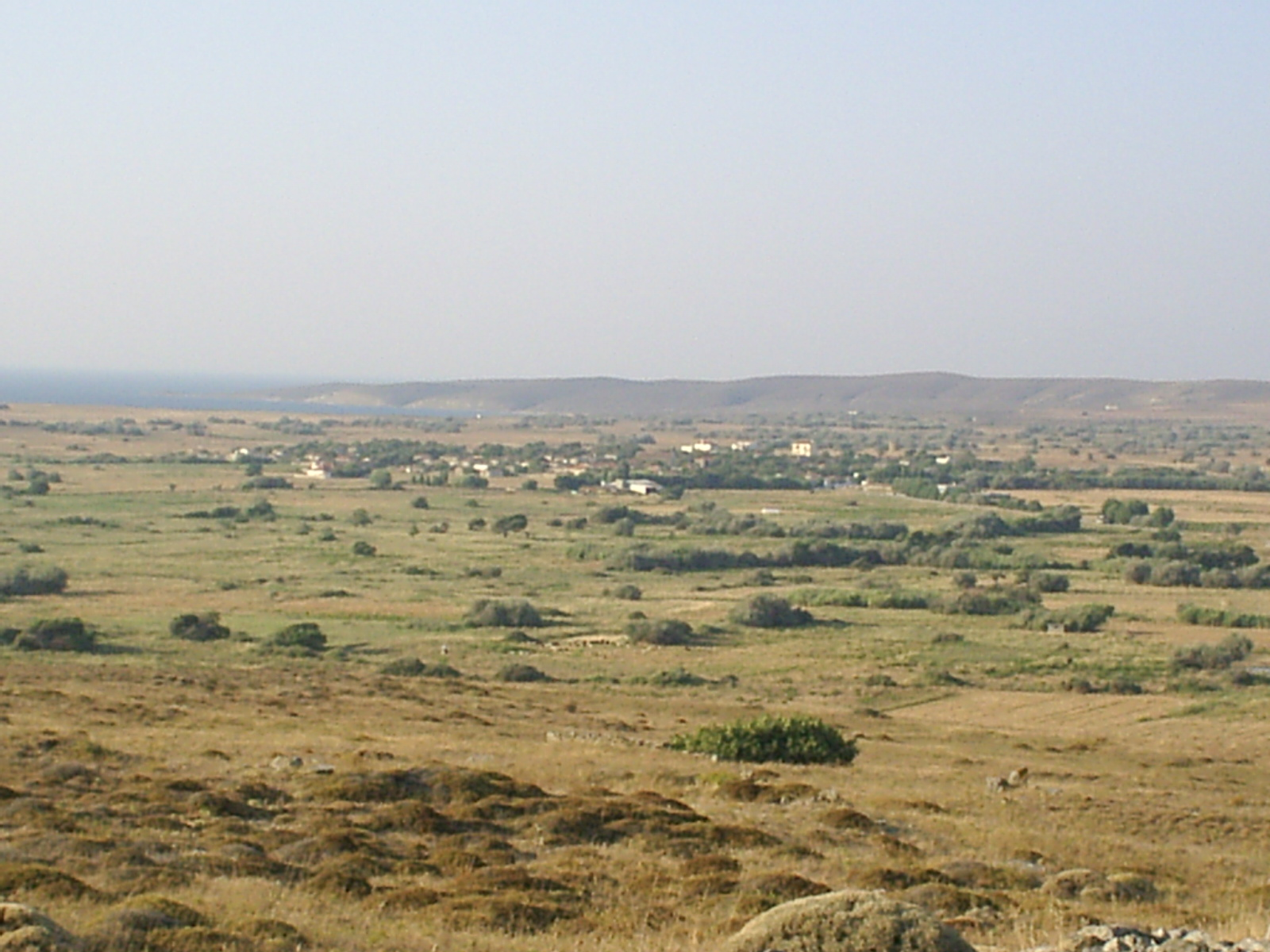

- Location within Greece
- Coordinates: 39°49′N 25°21′E
- Country: Greece
- Administrative region: North Aegean
- Regional unit: Lemnos
- Municipality: Lemnos
- Municipal unit: Moudros

Population (2021)
  - Community: 89
- Time zone: UTC+2 (EET)
  - Summer (DST): UTC+3 (EEST)

Fisini (Greek: Φισίνη) is a village and a community in the southeastern part of the island of Lemnos, Greece. It is in the municipal unit of Moudros. The community includes the village Agia Sofia.

== Population ==
Year	Agia Sofia	Fisini
1924	277	-
1961	161	-
1991	80	128
2001	69	84
2011	50	57
2021	60	29

== Localities ==
=== Agia Sofia ===
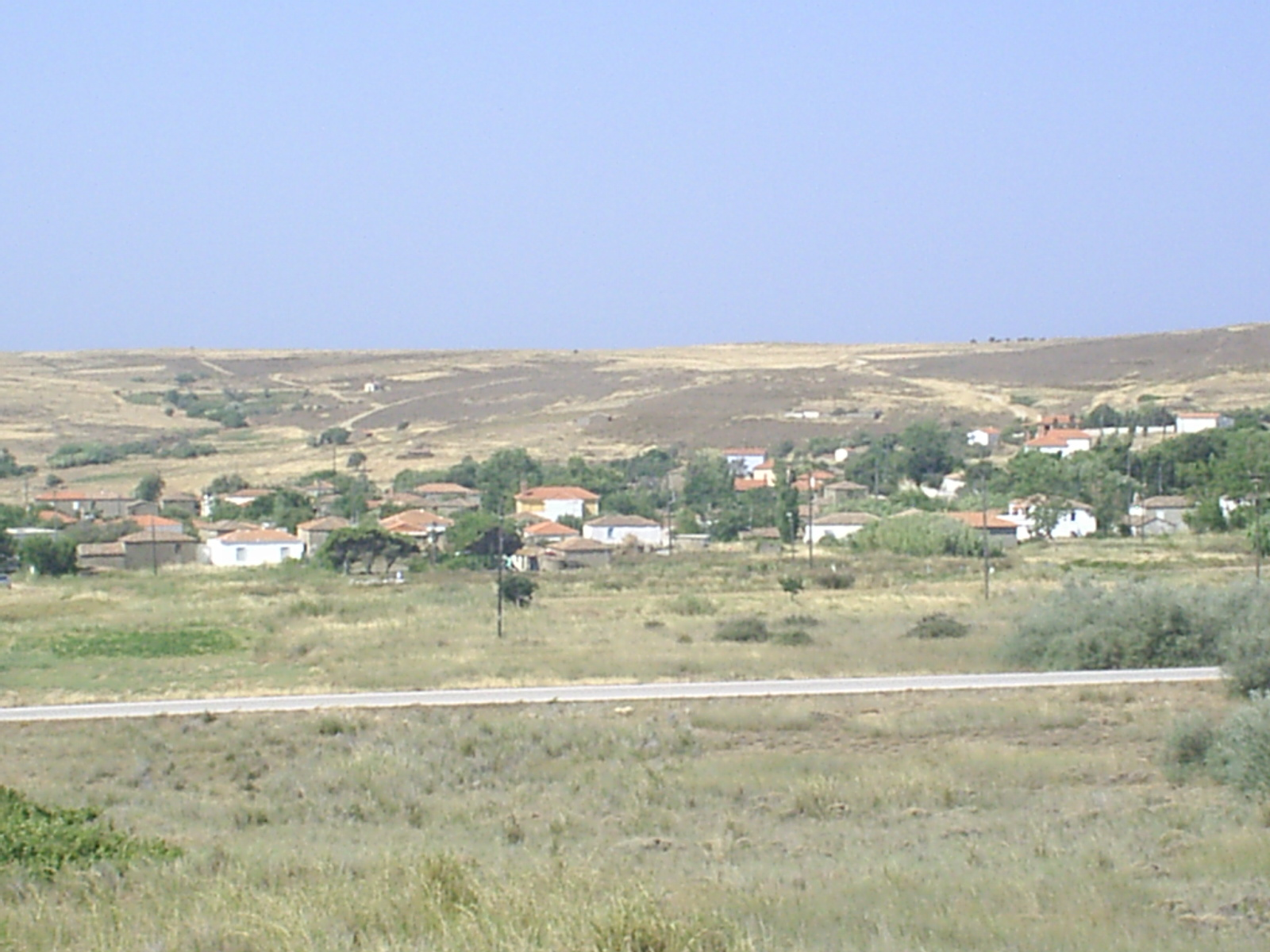
A view

Agia Sofia is a small settlement, 2 km northwest of Fisini and 4 km south of Kaminia. It was first mentioned in 1303. The present church was built in 1974, and replaced a building from 1914 that was damaged in the 1968 earthquake. According to tradition the settlement was originally built towards the west near the coast, at the locality Paliomantra. It was marked on the 1785 map of Choiseul-Gouffier at this old location, but Conze marked it at the present location in 1858. The move of the village must have taken place at the end of the 18th century, which coincides with an increase of pirate attacks. Also in the new location the villagers had to protect themselves against pirates, and built unique underground shelters known as moursa. Gradually, the village grew. In 1857, 73 men aged 18 to 60 paid 2,336 piastres to escape conscription. It had 35 families in 1863 and had 74 houses in 1874. Since 1918 Agia Sofia is part of the community of Fisini. Agia Sofia had 277 inhabitants in 1928, it had 191 in 1961 and only 55 in 2001. The public school, opened in 1919, was closed in 1972.

East of the village the ruins of the locality Agiomarnos can be found.

=== Paradeisi ===
The hill Paradeisi (286 m elevation) dominates southeastern Lemnos. It is situated northwest of Agia Sofia, and southwest of Kaminia. On old maps it is referred to as "Neptune hill" (Colle di Nettune) (Porcacchi, 1572), Neptunius Collis (Ortelius, 1589 and Mercator, 1607 and 1630). The name Paradeisi ("paradise") was first mentioned on a map of Joseph Roux (1764).

== See also ==
- List of settlements in the Lemnos regional unit

== Sources ==
- Antonis Diakoumos O topos pou pligosame (Ο τόπος που πληγώσαμε)
- Belitsos, Theodoros, Lemnos and its villages by Th. Belitsos 1994.
- Lemnos/Limnos Province CD Rom (Cdrom Επαρχείου Λήμνου = CD Rom Eparcheiou Limnou): Lovable Lemnos
- Belitsos, Theodoros: Historic route in Lemnos: Livadochori, Lemnos Newspapers, p 531 (June 10, 2008).
