= Nea Koutali =

Village in Lemnos, Greece

Nea Koutali Νέα Κούταλη
- Municipal unit
- Location within the regional unit

- Location within Greece
- Coordinates: 39°54′N 25°12′E
- Country: Greece
- Administrative region: North Aegean
- Regional unit: Lemnos
- Municipality: Lemnos
- Village established: 1926 (100 years ago)

Area
  - Municipal unit: 75.7 km^{2} (29.2 sq mi)

Population (2021)
  - Municipal unit: 2,249
  - Municipal unit density: 29.7/km^{2} (76.9/sq mi)
  - Community: 527
- Time zone: UTC+2 (EET)
  - Summer (DST): UTC+3 (EEST)
- Vehicle registration: MY

Nea Koutali (Greek: Νέα Κούταλη) is a village and a municipal unit on the island of Lemnos, North Aegean, Greece. Located in the south central portion of the island with a land area of 75.735 square kilometres (29.241 sq mi), it accounts for about 15.9% of the island's area, making it the smallest of the four municipal units on Lemnos. The village is the largest settlement in the municipal unit, though the seat of government is the village of Kontias.

== Subdivisions ==
Nea Koutali is subdivided into the following communities with their constituent villages shown in brackets:

- Agkaryones
- Kallithea
- Kontias
- Livadochori (Livadochori, Poliochni)
- Nea Koutali
- Pedino (Neo Pedino, Palaio Pedino, Vounaria)
- Portianou
- Tsimandria

The municipal unit also includes the island of Vounaria and the uninhabited islands of Alogonisi, which form part of Pedino, as well as the islands of Kastria and Kompi (both part of Tsimandria).

== Population ==
Year	Community population	Municipal unit population
1928	351	-
1951	457	-
1981	383	-
1991	438	2,901
2001	473	2,880
2011	442	2,526
2021	527	2,249

== History ==
The village was built in the area of Agia Marina in 1926 by refugees from the island of Koutali (now Ekinlik) in the Sea of Marmara after the Greco-Turkish War (1919–1922). Together with Agios Dimitrios, it is one of the villages built on Lemnos by refugees from Asia Minor. Initially, it was part of Pesperago (now Pedino). In 1947, the village became an independent community. Nea Koutali stands like an amphitheatre adjacent to the Moudros Gulf and stretches from the pine forests of Agia Triada to the stone built fishing port.

In 1928, Nea Koutali had 351 inhabitants, and a school was built. This school merged with the school in Neo Pedino in 1973. The village was built according to a modern layout and had a population of 500 people in 1938. Its residents included sailors, fishermen and sponge divers. In 1938, they produced 700 oka (900 kg) of sponges. Nea Koutali is still known in Greece and abroad for its sponge production.

== Maritime and Sponge Museum ==
On July 1, 2006, the Maritime and Sponge Museum was opened. It presents the maritime life of the people from Koutali before they fled from Propontis in 1922, through old photographs and artifacts, and tools and machinery related to sponge diving and processing. Also archaeological objects that were collected by sponge divers from Nea Koutali are displayed. These include amphoras, other ceramics, ancient anchors and other small objects which date back to the ancient Greek, Roman and Byzantine periods. They originated from different parts of the Aegean and the Mediterranean including Corinth, Chios, Thasos, Rhodes, Lesbos, but also from the Adriatic Sea coast, northern Spain and Egypt.

== Sources ==
- "Portianou of Lemnos" by Costas Kontellis, 1998.
- "Lemnos and its villages" by Th. Belitsos 1994.
- Vasiliki Tourptsoglou-Stefanidou, Travels And Geographic Texts On Lemnos Island (15th to 20th Centuries) (Ταξιδιωτικά και γεωγραφικά κείμενα για τη νήσο Λήμνο (15ος-20ος αιώνας), Thessaloniki 1986
- Lemnos Province CD Rom (Cdrom Επαρχείου Λήμνου): Lovable Lemnos

== See also ==
- List of settlements in the Lemnos regional unit
