= Livadochori =

Livadochori may refer to several places in Greece:

- Livadochori, Lemnos, a village on Lemnos Island, North Aegean
- Livadochori, Serres, a village in the municipal unit Strymoniko, Serres regional unit
- Livadochori, Trikala, a village in the municipal unit Pindos, Trikala regional unit
