= Kaminia, Lemnos =

Kaminia Καμίνια
- Community
- Location within Greece
- Coordinates: 39°51.8′N 25°19.4′E
- Country: Greece
- Administrative region: North Aegean
- Regional unit: Lemnos
- Municipality: Lemnos
- Municipal unit: Moudros

Area
  - Community: 12.847 km^{2} (4.960 sq mi)

Population (2021)
  - Community: 178
  - Density: 13.9/km^{2} (35.9/sq mi)
- Time zone: UTC+2 (EET)
  - Summer (DST): UTC+3 (EEST)

Kaminia (Greek: Καμίνια) is a village in the northeast of the island of Lemnos, Greece. It is a community of the municipal unit of Moudros. From 1918 until 1998, it was an independent community. The community includes the village Vroskopos. It is located in the southeastern peninsula of the island, 5 km east of Moudros, 6 km northwest of Fisini and 7 km south of Kontopouli. Its elevation is about 60 m. Its area is 12.847 km^{2}, of which 7.60 km^{2} are arable. According to the Köppen climate classification, Kaminia has a Hot-Summer Mediterranean climate(Csa).

== Population ==
Year	Population settlement	Population community
1951	874	-
1991	321	-
2001	319	347
2011	234	243
2021	170	178

== History ==
The village was first mentioned in 1346 in a document of the Great Lavra monastery on Mount Athos. During the Turkish rule, all of its residents were Greek. It had 90 families in 1874, and a community school was opened in that year. After the column of Kaminia was discovered in 1885, the village was visited by many tourists. In the 1920s and the 1930s, excavations by the Italian Archaeological School revealed the prehistoric settlement of Poliochne. A new school building was built in 1932, which was closed in 1994. Many of its residents emigrated after World War II, mainly to Montreal, Quebec, Canada. The inhabitants are mainly farmers and shepherds. At present mainly cereals and wine are cultivated, cotton was grown around 1970.

== Localities ==
=== Poliochne ===
The Bronze Age settlement Poliochne has been excavated near the beach of Vroskopos. It is believed to have been one of the most ancient towns in Europe.

=== Vroskopos ===
Vroskopos (also Voroskopos) is a small settlement on the coast, 2 km southeast of Kaminia. It was named after the nearby promontory. A settlement at the site of Vroskopos is evidenced by tombs from the 11th to 13th century. It was first mentioned by Florentine traveler Buondelmonti in 1418. A fortress was built in the 13th century. In the 15th century the coastal areas, including Vroskopos, were abandoned, but in the late 16th and 17th centuries the port was used again. The castle and the village were probably destroyed around 1656 in the Fifth Ottoman-Venetian War. Moreover, pirate attacks forced the inhabitants to move to inland villages such as Kaminia. By the 20th century Vroskopos was settled again as the sea port of Kaminia. Tourist facilities were built, and in 2011 Vroskopos had 9 permanent inhabitants.

== See also ==
- List of settlements in the Lemnos regional unit
- Lemnos stele

== Sources ==
- Vasiliki Tourptsoglou-Stefanidou: Journeys and Geographic Sources of the Island of Lemnos (15th-20th Centuries)
- Belitsos, Theodoros, Lemnos and its villages by Th. Belitsos 1994.
- Lemnos/Limnos Province CD Rom (Cdrom Επαρχείου Λήμνου = CD Rom Eparcheiou Limnou): Lovable Lemnos
- Belitsos, Theodoros: Lemnos and its villages, 1994
- Belitsos, Theodoros: Kaminia in Lemnos, 2004 A lot of people who live in Kaminia and Lemnos generally came from Egypt. Kaminia has a mild Mediterranean climate.
