= Kornos =

Kornos may refer to:

- Kornos, Cyprus
- Kornos, Greece
