= Portianou =

Portianou Πορτιανού
- Community
- Location within Greece
- Coordinates: 39°53′N 25°11′E
- Country: Greece
- Administrative region: North Aegean
- Regional unit: Lemnos
- Municipality: Lemnos
- Municipal unit: Nea Koutali

Population (2021)
  - Community: 236
- Time zone: UTC+2 (EET)
  - Summer (DST): UTC+3 (EEST)

Portianou (Greek: Πορτιανού) is a village on the Greek island of Lemnos, located northeast of Myrina.

== Geography ==
- Neo Pedino
- Palaio Pedino, southwest

== Population ==
Year	Population
1981	244
1991	251
2001	306
2011	314
2021	236

== The name ==
Originally the village was located further west near the area known as Ayios Spyridon, where we find remains of a cemetery and traces of old houses. According to old testaments, which cannot be verified, about three centuries ago a plague forced the population to move the village to its present position. In any event, the village’s name is not mentioned in any record kept by the Byzantine monasteries in Lemnos, as is the case with most other villages in the island. The first encounter of the name can be traced in 1785 on a map by Choiseul-Gouffier with the name of Portiano, a fact that leads us to conclude that the village was actually established three centuries ago.

From later-day travelers like: Conze (1858), De Launay (1898) and Fredrich (1904) the place name is noted as Portianos in the male gender. In community documents it is referred as Portianou. Finally, it was recorded as Portianon (neutral).

The place name is of Latin origins and seems to come from the merging of two words: “porto juno: new port”, referring to a small port that once existed to the southeast of the village, in an area known as Melagga (=black earth). The remains of an old watchtower (vigla) are still visible there, overlooking the port. It was probably built by the Venetians during their brief occupation of the island between 1656–57. Until 1940 the remains of the tower stood at approximately 6 meters (20 ft) high, however it was almost destroyed during the German occupation of the island during World War II.

== The Ottoman period ==
From the old community documents we learn that during 1854 the village had a priest named Margaritis. In 1856 it had 147 young men who paid 2.070 “grossia”γρόσια to avoid military service. In 1863 it had 71 resident families which in 1874 became 80, proof of a growing population. In the same year (1874), 97 houses were recorded in the village, which belonged to the municipal area of Kondias. The Portianites had also the right to send two representatives to the Pan-Lemnian regional council.

At the end of the 19th century the community had circulated coins stamped with initials ΧΠ Χωρίον Πορτιανού (Chorion Portianou =Portianou Village), whilst in 1912 the village hosted local post office with its own distinct seal. During that period the village was used as a midway station and crossing point of the Moudros Gulf for all those wishing to cross to the east side of the island and vice versa. This was due to the difficulty of crossing the “Varos” bridge which became impassable during the winter months due to the overflowing of the stream of Metropolis. There were close ties and social contact with Moudros because many merchants had shops on both sides of the bay. There were reports of shipping activities with special mention of the ship-owner Podaras around 1875.

== The church ==
In 1835, during the diocese of the metropolitan (bishop) Nectarios, as it is noted on the inscription, the main church of the village was built dedicated to “the Entry of the Most Holy Mother to the Temple” (Εισόδια της Θεοτόκου). In 1858 when Conze passed through the village he admired the colors of the church, which housed a marble sarcophagus. In a later inscription, during 1875, Pantelis Zanis is recorded as the master builder credited with the erection of this church. The same builder is credited with the building of churches in the villages of Atsiki (1868), Plati and Varos. The church was decorated by Aggelos Binetas from the village of Sarpi.

The Church, a triclit basilica, is impressive as it towers over the village, built on a small hill on the northwestern area of the village. It has an impressive screen (τέμπλο) with elaborate carvings, gold plated and icons painted by Gregoris Papamalis. The columns of the outer narthex are made from marble and most probably belonged to an earlier building. The bell tower is a later addition.

== The schools ==
The community school was established in 1870 by the name of Χριστοδουλίδειον Αρρεναγωγείον (Christodoulidion boys school), in honour of the founders and benefactors Kyriakos and Maria Christodoulou, wealthy Lemnians from Cairo, also instrumental in the erection of metropolitan church of Myrina and the founding of the Lemnian Brotherhood. The school had about 80 students and in 1874 became the community school. Initially with three classes, in 1909 adding another class and another in 1912.

An all-girls school was established in 1905, named Fergadiotiko, after its founder Athanasios Feragadiotis who came to lemons from Smyrne.

The two schools merged in 1920 and formed a primary (six classes) mixed school 1920, which was eventually housed in an impressive new school in building in 1931. Originally it functioned with three teachers and later with two eventually with only one teacher in 1963. Eventually it was closed in the 80’s due to lack of students. Today part of it functions as a nursery school. The main benefactors were Vassilios and Pinelopi Tselios, Yiorgos and Myrsine Constantinou as well as Antonios Velissaridis.

Amongst many, notable teachers of the Portionou School were: Christos Kontellis (1916–22, 1923–44), Emmanuel Ioannidis (1922–23, 1928–37), Evangelia Mauroudi (1948–63), Vaios Rigopoulos (1955–63) and Ignatios Papadopoulos (1966–76).

== Recent period ==
From April 1915 up until 1920, hundreds of dead soldiers from the Gallipoli Campaign were buried in the “Allied Cemetery of Portianou”, which stands to this day. There are 352 well-kept graves of British, French, Australian, New Zealand, Egyptian and Indian soldiers in this cemetery. During the Gallipoli Campaign Portianou was chosen as the command centre by the young Winston Churchill, mastermind behind the ill-fated war effort. The seat he used in the house he occupied is on exhibition in the local “Portianou Folkloric Museum”.

During 1918–21, hundreds of Russian expatriates and soldiers were accommodated in an area between the villages of Portianou and Tsimandria. They lived in very bad conditions, selling off their belongings in order to survive. Finally, 292 of them died during an epidemic which broke out during 1920–21. They were buried in what is today known as the “Russian Cemetery”, close to the sea.

In 1918 Portianon was listed as a community, which included the village of Pesperagon for a few months and later, between 1919 and 1928 the village of Angariones. Between the two World Wars the community witnessed important growth. The population increased to 617 residents in 1920 and in 1938 it numbered 750 residents and 250 houses. Notable amongst other activities, was the establishment the ‘Thriamvos” football club, which played against Livadochori and Moudros in 1931.

After the war the village population was in decline due to migration. From a population of 564 people in 1951, today it numbers a population of just above 200. Despite the population drain it still keeps a regional medical office and a Cultural Society. The Local Folklore Museum was established in 1995, featuring traditional dresses, household utensils, farming aids, old photographs and furniture donated by the local people and people from the surrounding villages. A venture by the Athens – Piraeus Portianites who also published a newspaper, “Τα νέα του Πορτιανού”(The Portianou News).

== Personalities ==
Apart from their agricultural and commercial activities, the people of Portianou developed a notable cultural and artistic tradition which is alive to this day.

- Notable stonemasons were Xenophon Keramidas, Constantinos Vogdanos, Paris Vogdanos, Dimitrios (Jim) Vogdanos, Ilias Vogdanos, Panayiotis Fergadiotis and others.
- Icon painters such as Gregorios, Manos and Stratonikos Papamalis, and artists like Yiannis Papaioannou (Pagonis) and Andreas Kontellis among others
- Educators and writers, notably Despina Vogdanou – Constantiou who became the mayor of Myrina and Costas Kontellis who wrote an excellent monogram on “Portianou of Lemnos”, with a great deal of information and photographs about the history of the village during the 20th century.

== Sources ==
- “Portianou of Lemnos” by Costas Kontellis, 1998.
- “Lemnos and its villages” by Th. Belitsos 1994.
- Vasiliki Tourptsoglou-Stefanidou Adventurous And Geographic Features On Lemnos Island (15th to 20th Centuries) (Ταξιδιωτικά και γεωγραφικά κείμενα για τη νήσο Λήμνο (15ος-20ος αιώνας) = Taxidiotika ke geografika kimena gia ti niso Limno (15os-20os eonas) Thessaloniki 1986
- Lemnos/Limnos Province CD Rom (Cdrom Επαρχείου Λήμνου = CD Rom Eparcheiou Limnou): Lovable Lemnos

== See also ==
- List of settlements in the Lemnos regional unit
