= Atsiki =

Atsiki Ατσική
- Municipal unit
- Location within the regional unit

- Location within Greece
- Coordinates: 39°57′N 25°13′E
- Country: Greece
- Administrative region: North Aegean
- Regional unit: Lemnos
- Municipality: Lemnos

Area
  - Municipal unit: 134.7 km^{2} (52.0 sq mi)

Population (2021)
  - Municipal unit: 2,246
  - Municipal unit density: 16.67/km^{2} (43.19/sq mi)
  - Community: 818
- Time zone: UTC+2 (EET)
  - Summer (DST): UTC+3 (EEST)
- Vehicle registration: MY

Atsiki (Greek: Ατσική) is a village and a former municipality on the island of Lemnos, North Aegean, Greece. Since the 2011 local government reform it is part of the municipality Lemnos, of which it is a municipal unit. It is located in the northern central part of the island and has a land area of 134.672 km², covering about 28.2% of the island's surface. The municipal seat was the town of Atsikí. Its next largest town is Ágios Dimítrios. The municipal unit's total population is 2,246 inhabitants (2021).
