= Kornos, Greece =

Village in Lemnos, Greece

Kornos Κορνός
- Community
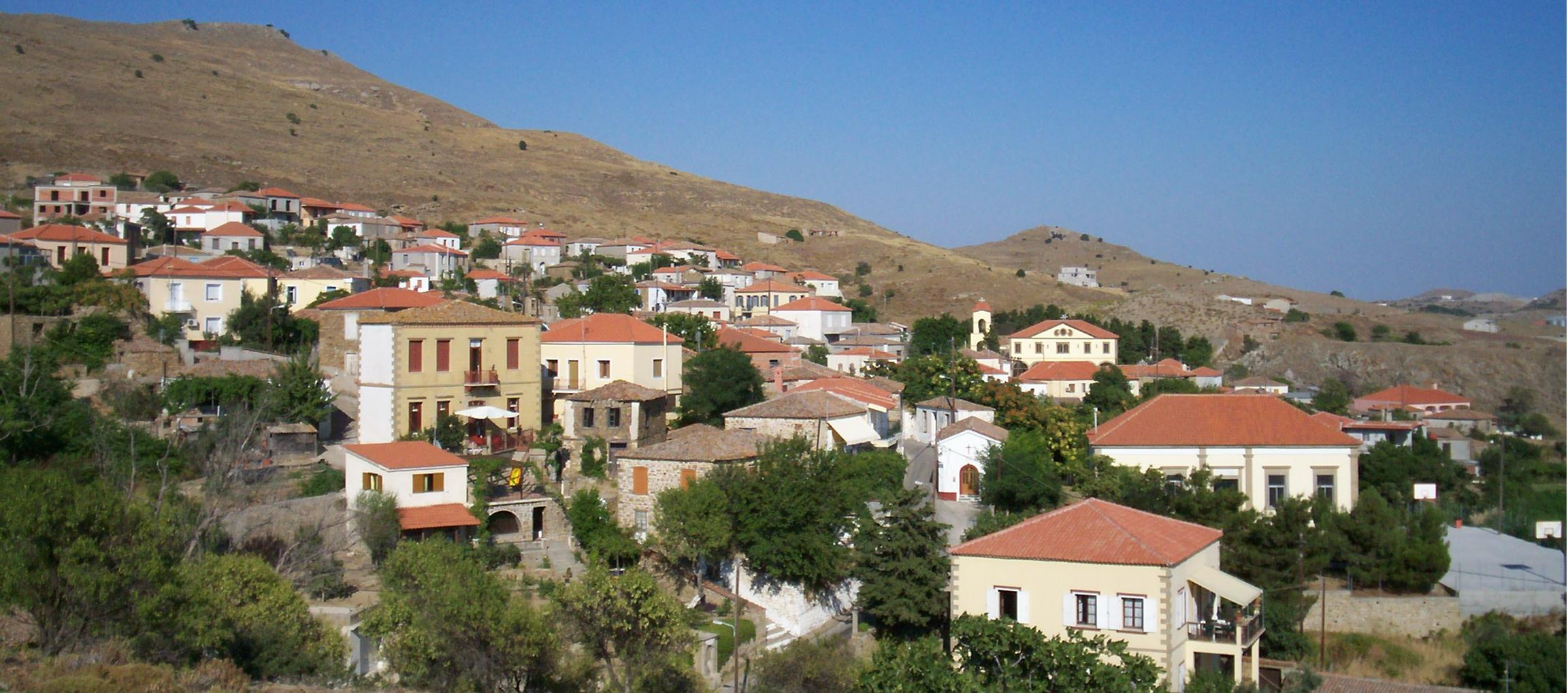

- Location within Greece
- Coordinates: 39°55′N 25°07′E
- Country: Greece
- Administrative region: North Aegean
- Regional unit: Lemnos
- Municipality: Lemnos
- Municipal unit: Myrina

Population (2021)
  - Community: 358
- Time zone: UTC+2 (EET)
  - Summer (DST): UTC+3 (EEST)

Kornos (Greek: Κορνός [korˈnos̠]) or Cornos is a traditional village of Lemnos, North Aegean, Greece. It is well known for its characteristic neoclassical mansions and the pastries produced in a local small industry.

Administratively it belongs to the municipal unit of Myrina, the capital of Lemnos. The first written reference to the village dates to 1361 and it flourished during the Ottoman occupation, when it was one of the richest villages on the island with a population of more than 2000 people. Many benefactors of the island descend from Kornos.

Amongst the main attractions of Kornos are the churches of the Assumption of the Virgin (Κοίμησις της Θεοτόκου) and St. Andrew (Άγιος Ανδρέας). About two km from the village are located the thermal springs of the island, called Therma (Θέρμα). The water of the springs, that is preferred for daily drinking by many residents of the island, is also used for therapeutic purposes.
