= Kontias =

Kontias Κοντιάς
- Community
- Location within Greece
- Coordinates: 39°52′N 25°09′E
- Country: Greece
- Administrative region: North Aegean
- Regional unit: Lemnos
- Municipality: Lemnos
- Municipal unit: Nea Koutali

Population (2021)
  - Community: 472
- Time zone: UTC+2 (EET)
  - Summer (DST): UTC+3 (EEST)

Kontias (Greek: Κοντιάς) is a village on the Greek island of Lemnos, North Aegean. It is the seat of the municipal unit Nea Koutali. Kontias is situated in the southwestern part of the island, 2 km west of Tsimandria, 3 km southwest of Portianou and 8 km east of the island capital Myrina

== Population ==
Year	Population
1920	1,272
1940	1,500
1981	549
1991	551
2001	628
2011	572
2021	472

== History ==
=== Byzantine period ===
The village was first mentioned as "the old castle of Konteas" in a census document of the Great Lavra monastery, of which it was a dependency. This castle had probably been built during the Venetian rule of the island (1207–76). According to local legends, the village was originally located near the sea, and it was resettled to the present inland location due to pirate raids. The original location was probably the small port of Agios Giannis, where ruins of a castle still remain.

=== Ottoman period ===
The bay of Kontias was mentioned by the Turkish naval sailor Piri Reis in 1521 as "Qondia Körfezi". Ships awaited favourable conditions to enter the Hellespont straits there. Piri Reis mentioned a castle at the bay, but no village. In the following ages, the port was mentioned by several travellers in the area. In 1770, during the Orlov Revolt, part of the Russian Navy fleet anchored in the port of Kontias, when they besieged Myrina.

The first mention of the village in the present location was in 1785, by Choiseul-Gouffier. Kontias was an organized settlement and one of the largest villages on the island. In 1856 it had 290 men who paid 9,280 piatres to avoid conscription. It had 176 families in 1863, and 187 in 1874. In the same year the municipality of Kontias was mentioned, consisting of the villages Kontias, Tsimandria, Portianou, Agkariones, Pesperago (now Pedino), Sarpi (now Kallithea) and Livadochori. This corresponds with the present municipal unit Nea Koutali. It was a rich village, because besides the agricultural activities there were many sailors and shipowners, including Papagiannis with 60 boats. The village school was first mentioned in 1873. A new school building was built in 1880. In 1910 two fountains were built: Tsikoulas and Kali Vrysi.

=== Modern period ===
Kontias joined the rest of Greece after the Balkan Wars in 1913. It became an independent community in 1918 named Kondias, which was changed into Kontias in 1940. During the years between the world wars, it had a remarkable growth in economy and population. In 1920 it had 1,272 inhabitants, making it the third largest village in Lemnos. In 1940 it had 1,500 inhabitants, making it the second village in population, after Myrina. A refugee settlement was built in 1926. Cotton production on Lemnos began from Kontias. After World War II, the population decreased due to internal and external migration. The population was 551 in 1991.

== See also ==
- List of settlements in the Lemnos regional unit

== Sources ==
- Tourptsoglou-Stefanidou Vassiliki, Voyages and Geographical Sources From Lemnos Island (15th-20th Centuries) (Ταξιδιωτικά και γεωγραφικά κείμενα για τη νήσο Λήμνο (15ος-20ος αιώνας))
- Belitsos, Theodoros, Lemnos and its villages, 1994.
- Lemnos Province CD Rom (Cdrom Επαρχείου Λήμνου): Lovable Lemnos
- Belitsos, Theodoros, Historic Route in Lemnos Kontias, Limnos p 452 (21-3-2007)
