= Agios Dimitrios, Lemnos =

Village in Lemnos, Greece

Agios Dimitrios Άγιος Δημήτριος
- Community
- Location within Greece
- Coordinates: 39°54′40″N 25°09′04″E
- Country: Greece
- Administrative region: North Aegean
- Regional unit: Lemnos
- Municipality: Lemnos
- Municipal unit: Atsiki

Population (2021)
  - Community: 736
- Time zone: UTC+2 (EET)
  - Summer (DST): UTC+3 (EEST)

Agios Dimitrios (Greek: Άγιος Δημήτριος, pronounced [ˈaʝoz̠ ðiˈmitɾjos̠]) is a settlement on the Greek island of Lemnos. As of the 2021 census, the island had a population of 736.

== In popular culture ==
In the military sandbox video game Arma 3, the village is depicted as the fictional village of Agios Dionysios, along with the rest of Lemnos as the fictional nation of Altis.
