= Menelaos Lountemis =

Greek writer

- Born: Dimitrios Valasiadis c. 1912; Agia Kyriaki or Constantinople, Ottoman Empire
- Died: 22 January 1977 (aged 70–71); Athens, Greece
- Occupations: Essayist, writer, translator

Menelaos Lountemis (Greek: Μενέλαος Λουντέμης; c. 1912 – 22 January 1977) was the pen name one of the most important essayists in the Greek interwar period and post-World War II era. His pen name was inspired by his later homeland's river Loudias.

== Early life ==
Lountemis was born to a Greek family as Dimitrios "Takis" Valasiadis (Δημήτριος (Τάκης) Βαλασιάδης) either in 1906 in Agia Kyriaki in Asia Minor or in 1912 in Constantinople. He was the only son among the five children of Grigoris Balassoglou (who after fleeing Turkey and finding refuge in Greece changed it to Valassiadis) and Domna Tsouflidi. His family came as refugees from Yalova after the Greek genocide, and they initially settled in Aegina, then in Edessa and finally in the village Exaplatanos of Pella, where he lived from 1923 to 1932 when he moved to Kozani. He lived for a while in the state boarding house of Edessa. His family was wealthy, but bankrupted in the Greco-Turkish War (1919–22) and Lountemis had to work hard in his adolescence as a scullion, shoeblack, cantor, and teacher in villages of Almopia, and even as a foreman at the then under construction Gallikos river infrastructure works. In the 10th grade – of the six-grade secondary school of that time – he left school due to political reasons and he was expelled from all secondary schools of his country. (His engagement in left-wing politics and his political activities from inside the lines of the Communist Party of Greece cost him his expulsion from the entire school system.)

Through an odyssey of successive resettlements, from Edessa to a state boarding house in Kozani and then to Volos, following a wandering group of that time, he finally reached Athens and became a close connection of Kostas Varnalis, Angelos Sikelianos and Miltiadis Malakassis. The latter helped him to be appointed to the "Athenian Club" as a librarian in 1938 and to recover financially. At the same time his friendship with Professor of Philosophy Nikolaos Veis, would allow him to attend courses at the School of Philosophy of Athens. A lot of literary successes followed and he became a member of the Hellenic Association of Litterateurs, under the presidency of Nikos Kazantzakis.

== Career ==
He first appeared in Greek literature at very young age, publishing his poetry collections in "Agrotiki Idea" of Edessa in 1927 and 1928, which was signed under his real name (Takis Valassiadis). Around 1930 he published poems and short stories in "Nea Estia" magazine. The first time he used his pen name was in 1934 for the short story "One night with many lights under a city with many stars" (Greek: Μια νύχτα με πολλά φώτα κάτω από μια πόλη με πολλά αστέρια). In 1938 was one of the 3 that shared the Greek National Literature Prize (the Prose section), for his short stories collection "The ships never came at shore" (Greek: Τα πλοία δεν άραξαν ") and in 1951 Golden Daphne Award in Paris. Hellenic Association of Litterateurs established the annual "Menelaos Lountemis" award in his honor. A public building in Bucharest was named after him (Lountemis Mansion). According to Vassilis Vassilikos, "he is considered the most widely read Greek writer after Nikos Kazantzakis". His "One child counts the stars" (Greek: Ένα παιδί μετράει τ' άστρα) was a best Greek best-seller of the 1950s and the most known of his books.

== Works ==
1. "Τα πλοία δεν άραξαν", Athens, PUB: Γκοβόστης, short stories (1938) ISBN 960-344-915-6
2. «Περιμένοντας το ουράνιο τόξο», Athens, short stories (1940)
3. «Γλυκοχάραμα», Athens, short stories (1944)
4. «Το τραγούδι των διψασμένων», Athens, PUB: Δωρικός, short stories (1966)
5. «Βουρκωμένες μέρες», Athens, short stories (1953) ISBN 960-344-914-8
6. «Αυτοί που φέρανε την καταχνιά», Athens, short stories (1946) ISBN 960-393-140-3
7. «Έκσταση», Athens, PUB: Αετός, novel (1943) ISBN 960-393-139-X
8. «Καληνύχτα ζωή», Athens, novel (1946) ISBN 960-393-138-1
9. «Οι κερασιές θ' ανθίσουν και φέτος», Athens, PUB: Μόρφωση, novel (1956)
10. «Συννεφιάζει», Athens, novel (1946) ISBN 960-344-837-0
11. «Ένα παιδί μετράει τ' άστρα», Athens, PUB: Δίφρος, novel (1956) ISBN 960-344-768-4
12. «Η φυλακή του Kάτω Kόσμου», Athens, PUB: Δωρικός, novel (1964) ISBN 960-393-312-0
13. «Το ρολόι του κόσμου χτυπά μεσάνυχτα», Athens, PUB: Κέδρος, novel (1963) ISBN 960-344-888-5
14. "Τότε που κυνηγούσα τους ανέμους", Athens, PUB: Δίφρος, novel (1956) ISBN 960-393-137-3
15. «Λύσσα», novel
16. «Τρόπαια Α΄», (Η οπτασία του Μαραθώνα), novel
17. «Τρόπαια Β΄», (Σαλαμίνα), novel
18. «Κάτω απ' τα κάστρα της ελπίδας», novel ISBN 960-393-183-7
19. «Το κρασί των δειλών», (Σαρκοφάγοι Ι), Athens, Πολιτικές και λογοτεχνικές εκδόσεις, novel (1965) ISBN 960-393-023-7
20. "Οι ήρωες κοιμούνται ανήσυχα", (Σαρκοφάγοι ΙΙ), Athens, PUB: Δωρικός, novel (1974)
21. «Ο άγγελος με τα γύψινα φτερά», (Σαρκοφάγοι ΙΙΙ), Athens, PUB: Δωρικός, novel (1974)
22. «Οδός Αβύσσου αριθμός 0», Athens, PUB: Βιβλιοεκδοτική, novel (1962) ISBN 960-344-820-6
23. «Θυμωμένα στάχυα», Athens, PUB: Δωρικός, novel (1965) ISBN 960-344-993-8
24. «Αγέλαστη Άνοιξη», novel ISBN 960-393-024-5
25. «Της γης οι αντρειωμένοι...», Athens, βιογραφίες (1976)
26. «Οι αρχιτέκτονες του τρόμου», Athens, PUB: Δωρικός, satirical novel (1966)
27. «Οι κεραυνοί ξεσπούν», Athens, PUB: Κάδμος, play (1958)
28. «Θα κλάψω αύριο», (σκηνικό ρομάντσο), Athens, PUB: Δωρικός, play (1975)
29. «Ανθισμένο όνειρο», Athens, PUB: Δωρικός, play (1975)
30. «Ταξίδια του χαμού», Athens, PUB: Δωρικός, play (1975)
31. «Πικρή θάλασσα», (ελληνική θαλασσογραφία), Athens, PUB: Δωρικός, play (1976)
32. «Μπατ-Τάι», (Οδοιπορικό στο Βιετνάμ), Athens, PUB: Δωρικός, travel literature (1966)
33. «Ταξίδι στην απεραντοσύνη», (Οδοιπορικό), Athens, PUB: Δωρικός, political essay (1976)
34. «Οι Δήμιοι με τ’ άσπρα γάντια», Athens, PUB: Δωρικός, play δράμα (1978)
35. «Δαίδαλος», σε εικονογράφηση Γ.Πανετέα, Athens, PUB: Δωρικός, short stories for children ISBN 960-393-136-5
36. «Ίκαρος», short stories for children ISBN 960-344-835-4
37. «Ηρακλής», Athens, PUB: Δωρικός, short stories for children (1976) |ISBN 960-393-135-7
38. "Θησέας", short stories for children ISBN 960-344-771-4
39. "Ο μεγάλος Δεκέμβρης", Athens, PUB: Μαρής-Κοροντζής, short stories for children (1945)
40. «Κραυγή στα πέρατα», Athens, PUB: Παλμός, poetry collection (1954)
41. «Θρηνολόι και άσμα για το σταυρωμένο νησί», Athens, PUB: Δωρικός, poetry collection (1975)
42. «Το σπαθί και το φιλί», Athens, PUB: Δωρικός, poetry collection (1967)
43. «Κοντσέρτο για δύο μυδράλια και ένα αηδόνι», Athens, PUB: Δωρικός, poetry collection (1973)
44. «Πυρπολημένη μνήμη», Athens, PUB: Δωρικός (1975)
45. «Οι εφτά κύκλοι της μοναξιάς», Athens, PUB: Δωρικός, poetry collection (1975)
46. «Τραγουδώ για την Κύπρο», Athens, PUB: Μόρφωση, poem (1956)
47. «Ο λυράρης (Μιλτιάδης Μαλακάσης)», Athens, PUB: Δωρικός (1974)
48. «Ο κονταρομάχος (Κώστας Βάρναλης)», Athens, PUB: Δωρικός (1974)
49. «Ο εξάγγελος (Άγγελος Σικελιανός)», Athens, PUB: Δωρικός, poetry (1976)
50. «Καραγκιόζης ο Έλληνας», Athens, PUB: Δωρικός
51. «Ο γολγοθάς μιας ελπίδας», Athens, PUB: Δωρικός
52. «Μενέλαος Λουντέμης Απανθίσματα», Athens, PUB: Ελληνικά Γράμματα (2004) του Δαυίδ Ναχμία
53. «Μια Νύχτα με πολλά φώτα,κάτω από μια πόλη με πολλά Αστέρια», PUB: Ελληνικά Γράμματα (1934)

=== Translations ===
- «Το σπίτι της ομίχλης», Θεόδωρου Κωνσταντίν, novel
- «Μορομέτε», Μαρίν Πρέντα, novel
- «Και τους καταδικάσα όλους σε θάνατο», Τίτους Πόποβιτς, novel
- «Πέρα απ' τς αμμόλοφους», Φάνους Νεάγκου, novel
- «Πύρινα άλογα», Ίον Μπραντ, poetry
- «Το λουλούδι της στάχτης», Εουτζέν Ζεμπελεάνου, Αθήνα, εκδ. Δωρικός, poetry (1974)
- «Οι φρουροί των ανέμων», Βίρτζιλ Θεοδορέσκου, poetry
- «Ο ιππότης της μοναξιάς», Ζέο Ντιμιτρέσκου, poetry
- «Σαρκασμοί και εφιάλτες», Μαρίν Σορέσκου, poetry
- «Ένας άνθρωπος Οστην αγορά», Ντομίτρου Ποπέσκου, poetry
- «Άσπιλοι κι αμόλυντοι», Χόρια Λοβινέσκου, Αθήνα, PUB: Δωρικός, play-satire (1975)

== Notes ==
1. According to Exaplatanos Municipality, he is born in 1911. Other sources report him born in 1906 or in 1907.
  "Μενέλαος Λουντέμης" from Municipality of Exaplatanos.
2. Municipality of Exaplatanos website
3. "Πολιτισμός: Μενέλαος Λουντέμης" από τη Δημοτική Επιχείρηση "Καταρράκτες Έδεσσας" (ΔΕΚΕ).
4. "Μεγάλος Ξεριζωμός": ο βίαιος επαναπατρισμός των προσφύγων του Πόντου και της Μικράς Ασίας στην Ελλάδα, κατά τη Μικρασιατική Καταστροφή.
5. "Λουντέμης Μενέλαος" – Ελληνική και παγκόσμια λογοτεχνία από την ιστοσελίδα Logotexnia.com.
6. "Μενέλαος Λουντέμης" από το 4ο Δημοτικό Σχολείο Αριδαίας.
7. According to other sources he loses his Greek citizenship in 1962. BOOKSINFO.GR
8. Κυκλοφόρησε και έκδοση γ' εκ νέου επεξεργασμένη, Αθήνα, εκδ. Δωρικός (1966).
9. Κυκλοφόρησε και έκδοση β΄με τίτλο "Οι τουρκοφάγοι – Το κρασί των δειλών", Αθήνα, εκδ. Δωρικός, (1966).

== Sources ==
- "Λουντέμης Μενέλαος", Παγκόσμιο Βιογραφικό Λεξικό, τομ. 5, Αλέξανδρου Ζήρα, Αθήνα, εκδ. Εκδοτικής Αθηνών, (1986).
- "Μενέλαος Λουντέμης", Η μεσοπολεμική πεζογραφία – Από τον πρώτο ως τον δεύτερο παγκόσμιο πόλεμο (1914–1939), τόμ. Ε΄, σ.232–252, Βαγγέλης Χατζηβασιλείου, Αθήνα, εκδ. Σοκόλης, (1992).
- "Έλληνες συγγραφείς", επιμ. Γιώργου Γούλη, Ινστιτούτο Επιμορφωτικών Βοηθημάτων, εκδ. Εταιρίας Λογοτεχνικών Εκδόσεων.
- Συλλογή με τα ποιήματα του κυκλοφορεί από τις εκδ. Ελληνικά Γράμματα, υπό τον τίτλο "Τα Ποιητικά του" ISBN 960-344-694-7.
- "Ο δικός μας Μενέλαος Λουντέμης", Αθήνα, Φώτη Σιούμπουρα (2005).
  Συζητήσεις και συνεντεύξεις του δημοσιογράφου με το μεγάλο Έλληνα συγγραφέα.
- "Βόλος, ένας αιώνας. Από την ένταξη στο ελληνικό κράτος (1881) ές τους σεισμούς (1955)", Εκδόσεις Βόλος, Βόλος 1999, σ. 205–6.
- Μενέλαος Λουντέμης "Ένα παιδί μετράει τ'άστρα", Αθήνα, ειδική έκδοση για την εφημερίδα Το Βήμα, (2012)
