= Agios Efstratios =

Agios Efstratios Άγιος Ευστράτιος
- Municipality
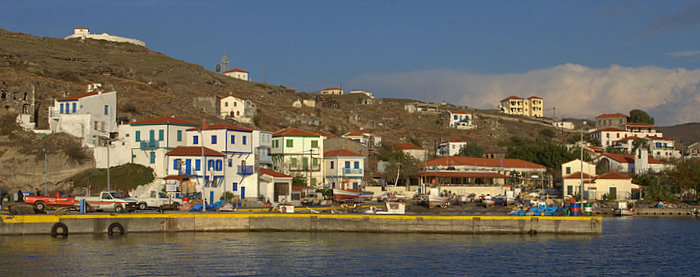
- Agios Efstratios village

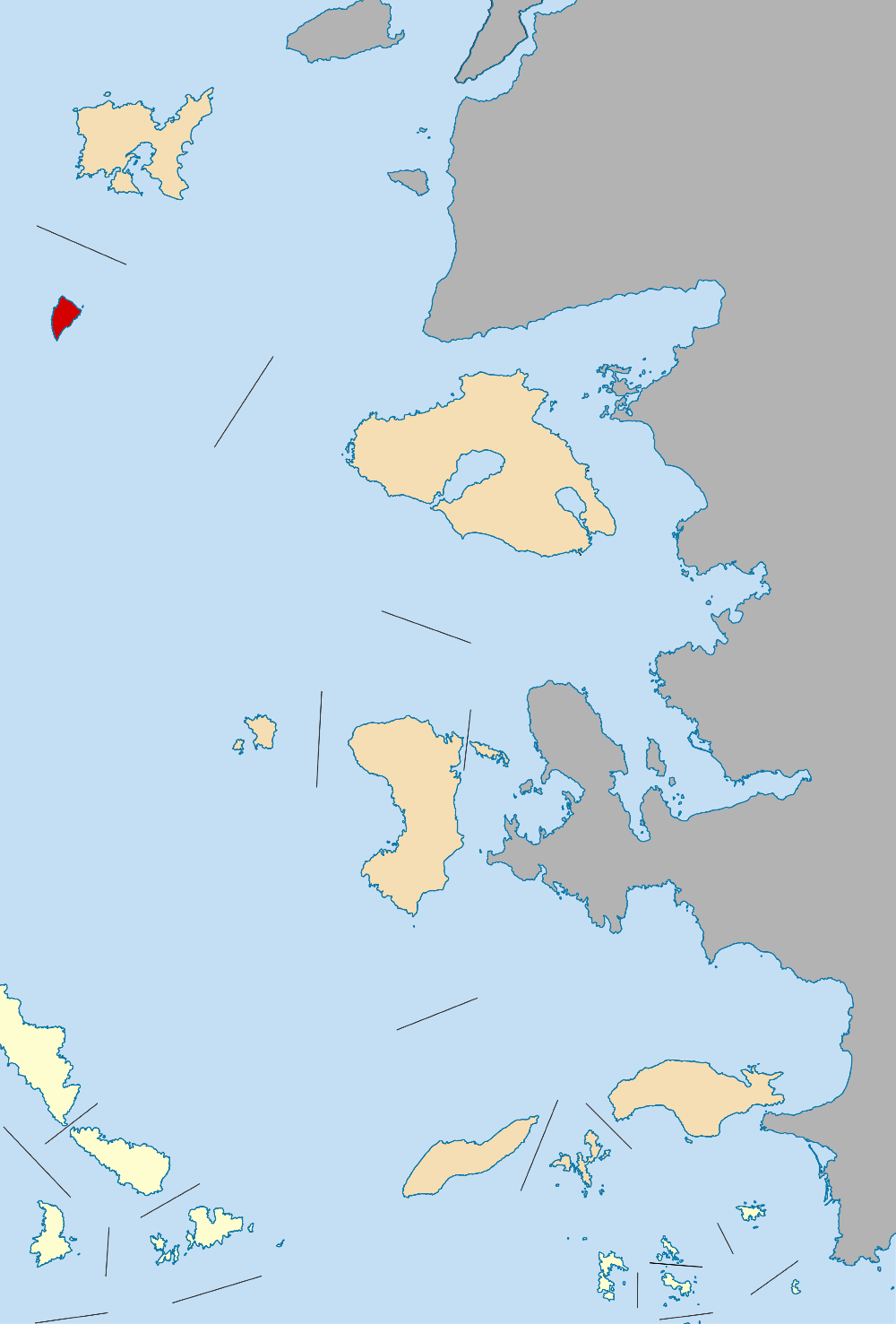

- Location within Greece
- Coordinates: 39°31′N 25°00′E
- Country: Greece
- Administrative region: North Aegean
- Regional unit: Lemnos

Area
  - Municipality: 43.325 km^{2} (16.728 sq mi)

Population (2021)
  - Municipality: 257
  - Density: 5.93/km^{2} (15.4/sq mi)
- Time zone: UTC+2 (EET)
  - Summer (DST): UTC+3 (EEST)
- Postal code: 815 00
- Area code: 2254
- Vehicle registration: ΜΗ, ΜΥ

Agios Efstratios or Saint Eustratius (Greek: Άγιος Ευστράτιος), colloquially Ai Stratis (Greek: Άη Στράτης), anciently Halonnesus or Halonnesos (Ancient Greek: Ἁλόννησος), is a small Greek island in the northern Aegean Sea about 30 kilometres (19 miles) southwest of Lemnos and 80 kilometres (50 miles) northwest of Lesbos. The municipality has an area of 43.325 km^{2}. Together with Lemnos and nearby islets it forms the regional unit of Lemnos, part of the Greek archipelagic region of the North Aegean.

== Name ==
In antiquity the island was known as Halonnesus, and under this name was a bone of contention between ancient Athens and Macedon as was noted in On the Halonnesus, attributed to Demosthenes. The island was named after Saint Eustratius (Όσιος Ευστράτιος ο Θαυματουργός), who lived on the island in the 9th century as an exile, because he was opposed to the iconoclastic policies of the Byzantine Emperor Leo the Armenian. His grave is still being shown by the inhabitants. The island is mentioned in the Isolario by Cristoforo Buondelmonti in 1420 as Sanstrati. It was also known as "Bozbaba" during Ottoman rule. The Ottoman Census of 1831 states that the island population was composed exclusively of Greeks, and that there were 310 Greek males fit to fight. This register did not include women, orphans, Christians below the age of puberty, high-ranking officials, and the mentally or physically incapacitated, so the actual population would be much higher.

== Geography ==
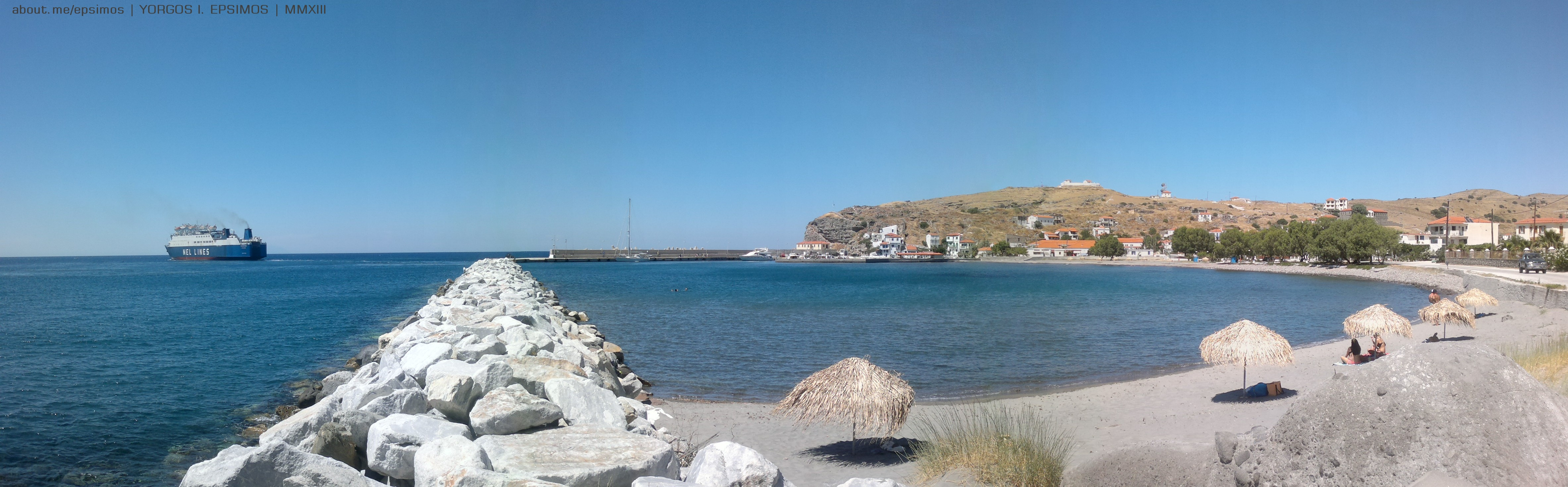
View of the harbour of Agios Efstratios

Agios Efstratios is quiet, isolated and dry, with a population of approximately 300 people. The climate is arid, with little rainfall during the winter months and long, hot summers. The landscape is mostly rocky, with scarce and low vegetation. Locust infestation is a recurring problem. Crops are insignificant; the surrounding sea, however, is rich in fish which are fished by local fishermen. There are numerous beaches on the island such as Agios Antonios, Lemonies, Avlakia and others, most of which are reached by caique. Agios Efstratios Island is linked by boat with Limnos, Agios Konstantinos, Kymi and Kavala.

== Recent political history ==
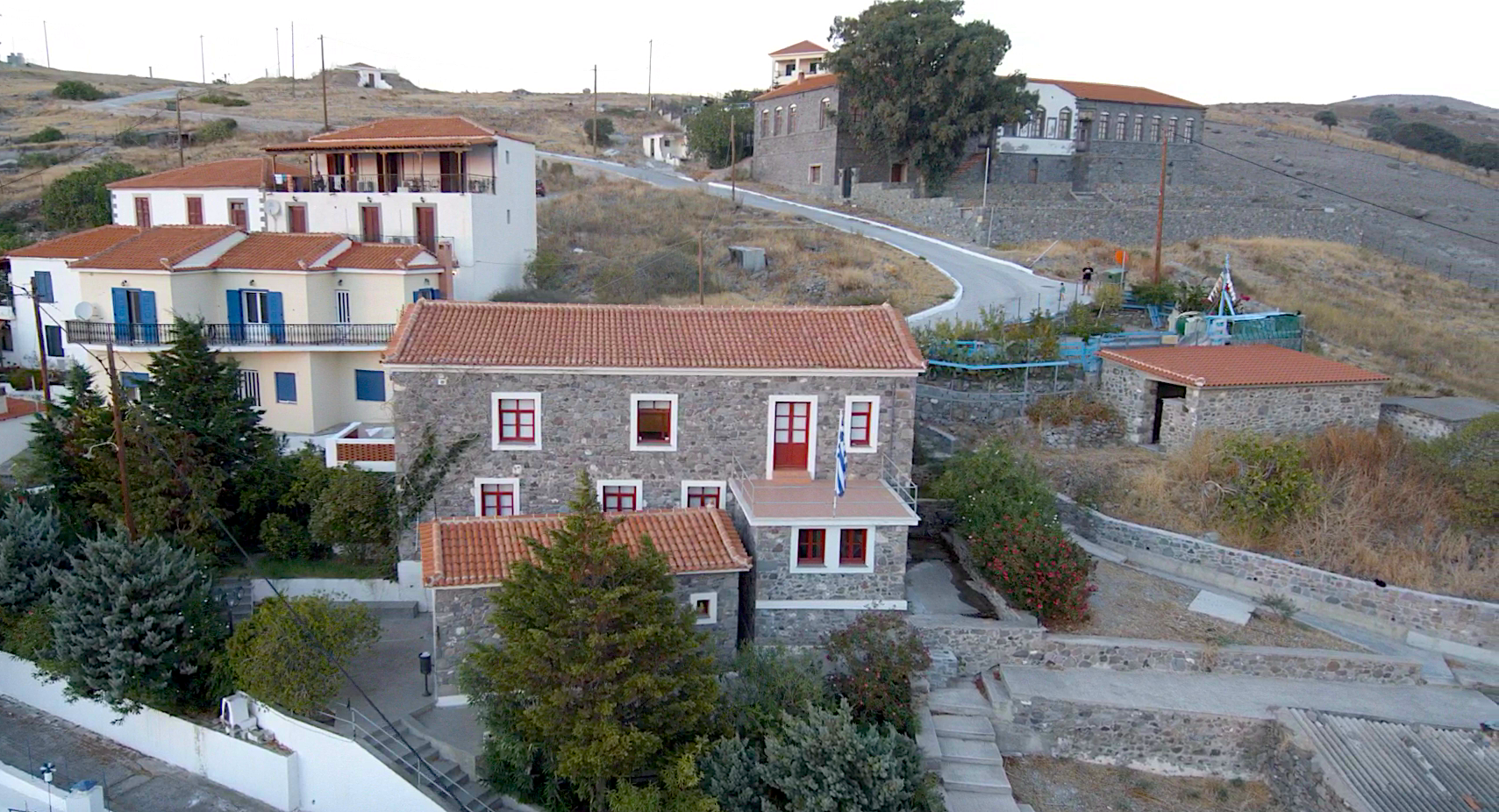
The Democracy Museum, established in 2007

The island was used to house political prisoners in internal exile since the 1930s. The first communists were exiled to the island with the Idionymon law of Venizelos, later during the Metaxas Regime and again during the Greek Civil War. After Makronisos it became the largest prison island in Aegean. During the Greek military junta of 1967–74, the island was again used as a prison for political dissidents. Exiles here included Ilias Iliou, Stefanos Sarafis, Dimitris Glinos, Kostas Varnalis, Tasos Leivaditis, Yiannis Ritsos, Menelaos Lountemis, Manos Katrakis, Kostas Gavriilidis and Mikis Theodorakis.

On 19 February 1968, an earthquake (7.1 on the Richter scale) demolished most of the houses, which were replaced by concrete prefabricated buildings laid out in a military-like camp formation. Nonetheless, the island retains a very attractive capital, also called Agios Efstratios, while preserving a rather unspoiled Mediterranean environment with pristine beaches. It is mostly a place for relaxation and meditation.

== Greece's first green island ==
Athens News Agency reported that, on 4 June 2009, at a two-day international conference in Athens on "Climate change and Challenges for the Future Generations" under the patronage of UNESCO, Greece's Development Minister Kostis Hatzidakis said that Agios Efstratios would soon become the country's first "green" island, entirely powered by renewable energy sources (RES), its residents relying on solar and wind generated energy and moving around the island on bicycles and in electric cars. Hatzidakis said a €10 million project would be implemented by 2010. At the same conference Professor Philippos Tsalidis, Development Ministry General Secretary for Research and Technology, said that although Greece's energy needs currently required strategic reliance on natural gas, Aghios Efstratios, could serve as a global model for 100% reliance on RES. Agios Efstratios is included in the European Union's Natura 2000 network of nature protected areas.

== Transportation ==
Agios Efstratios has one port, which offers year-round ferry connections to the island of Lemnos, as well to mainland Greece, namely Lavrio. The ship operating these routes is owned by Hellenic Seaways. There is also a small heliport on the main village outskirts, but it is used mostly for emergency airlift, or coast guard and military helicopters' stopover.

== In popular culture ==
A slightly fictionalized Agios Efstratios appears in the 2013 tactical shooter video game Arma 3 as the island of "Stratis", part of the island country of the "Republic of Altis and Stratis". In the game, Stratis is mostly composed of sparse military installations and a small airfield, with most of the civilian settlements on the island having been left abandoned following a civil war. "Altis", based on Lemnos, is north of the island as it is in real life.

== Gallery ==
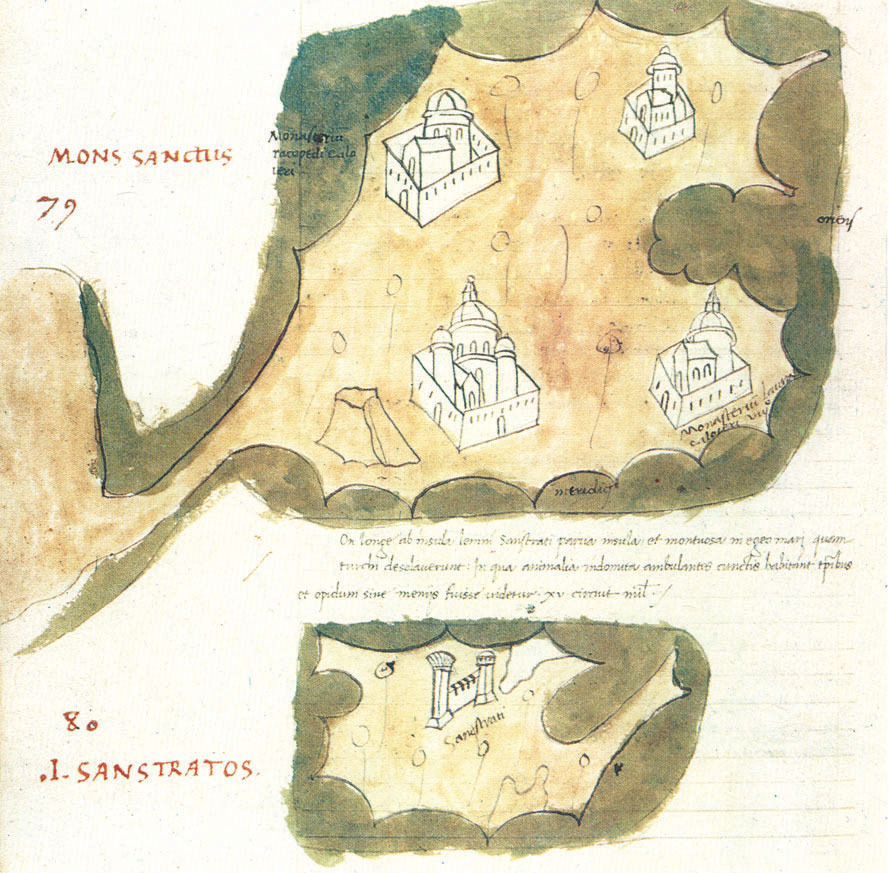
A 1400's map where the name Sanstratos is used

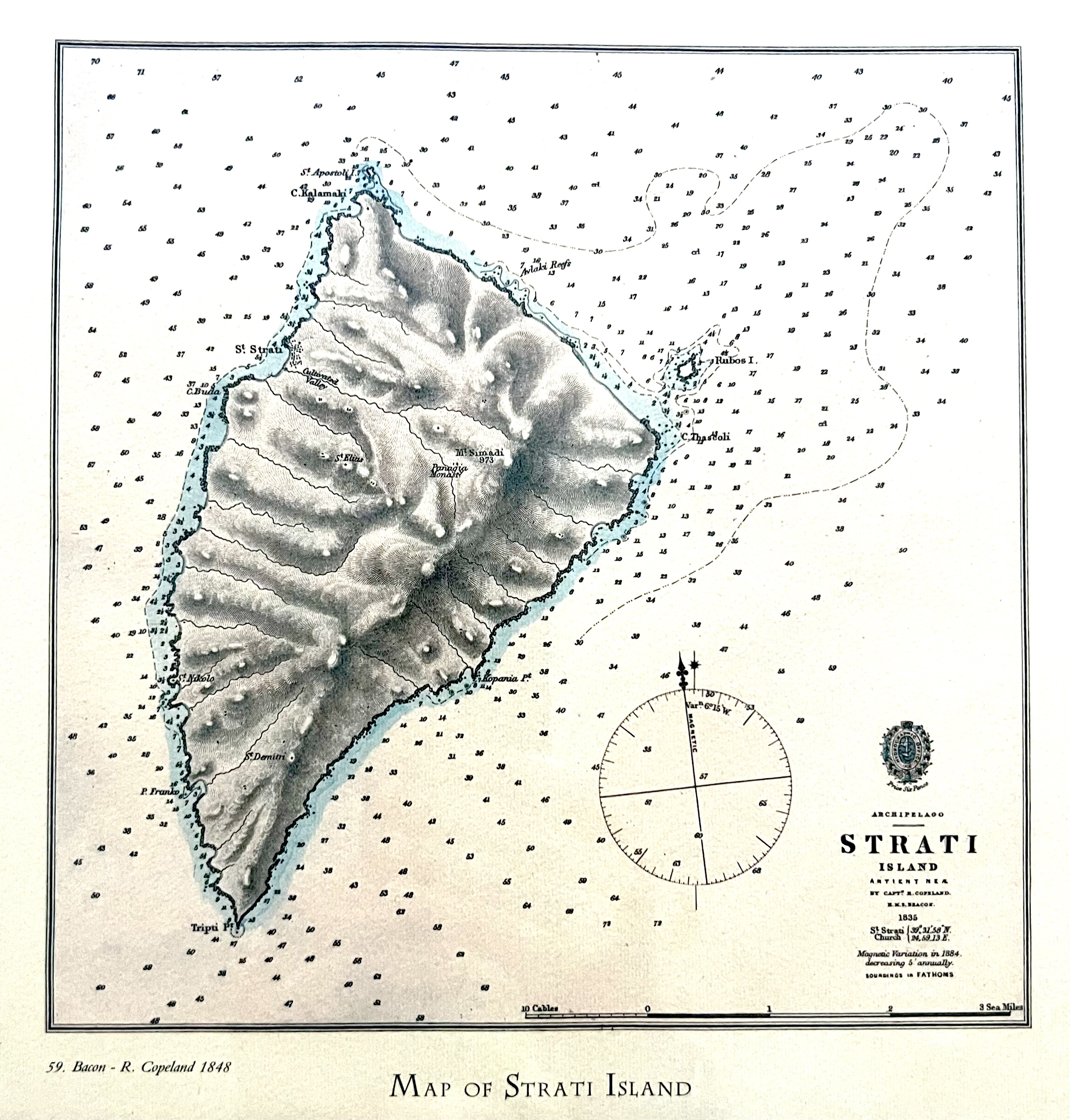
Map of Agios Efstratios, 1848

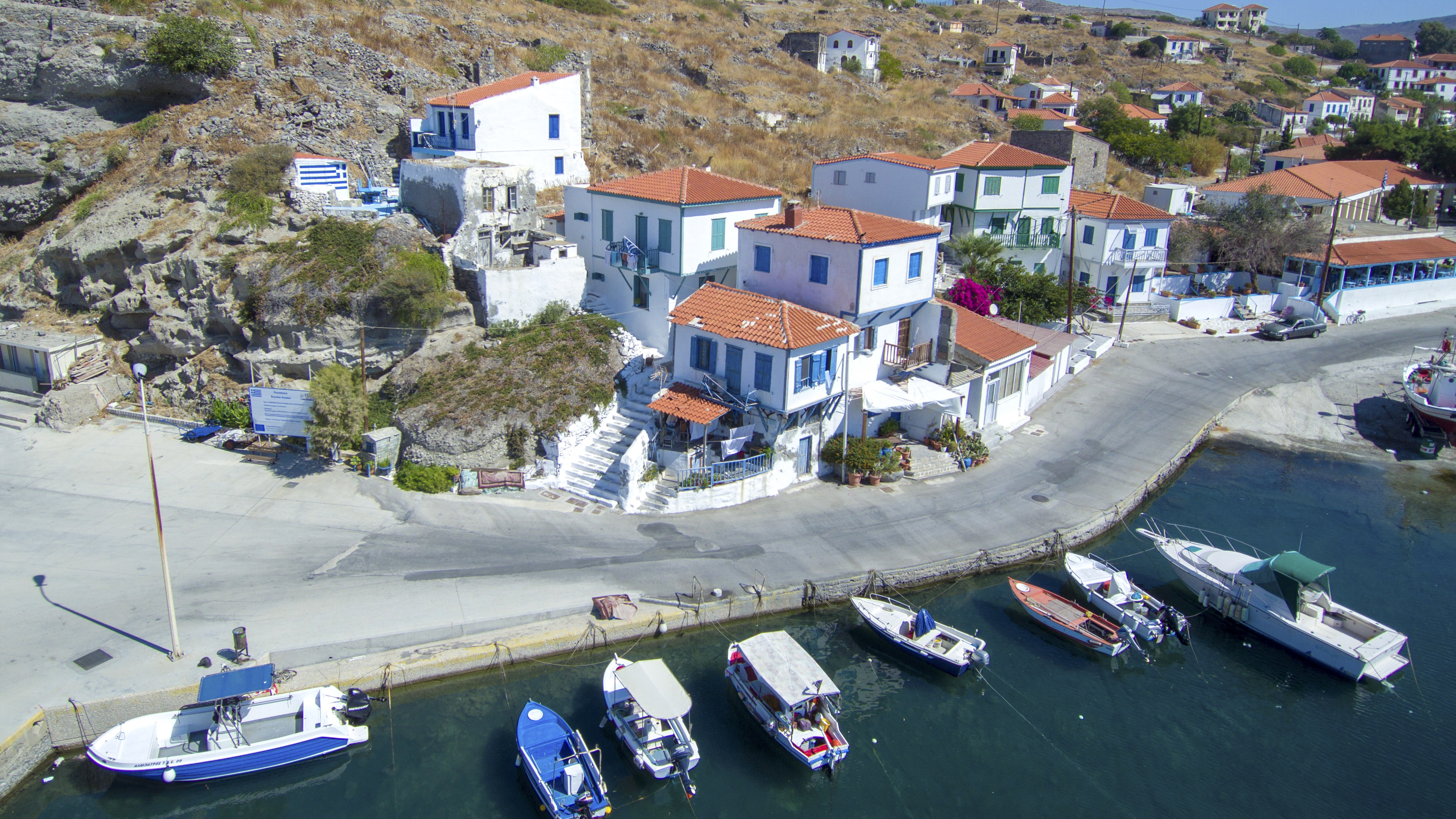
Harbor view

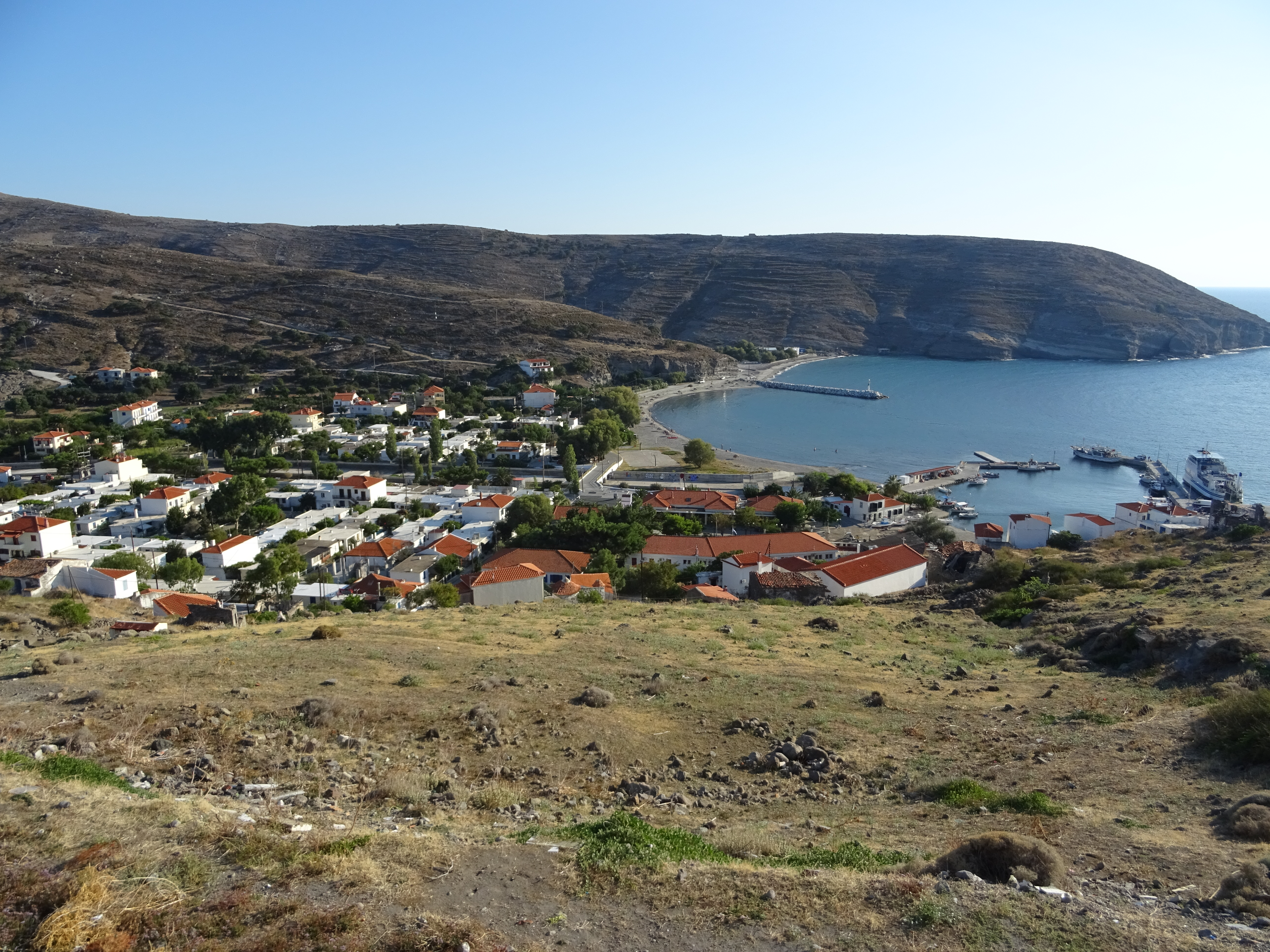
Village overview

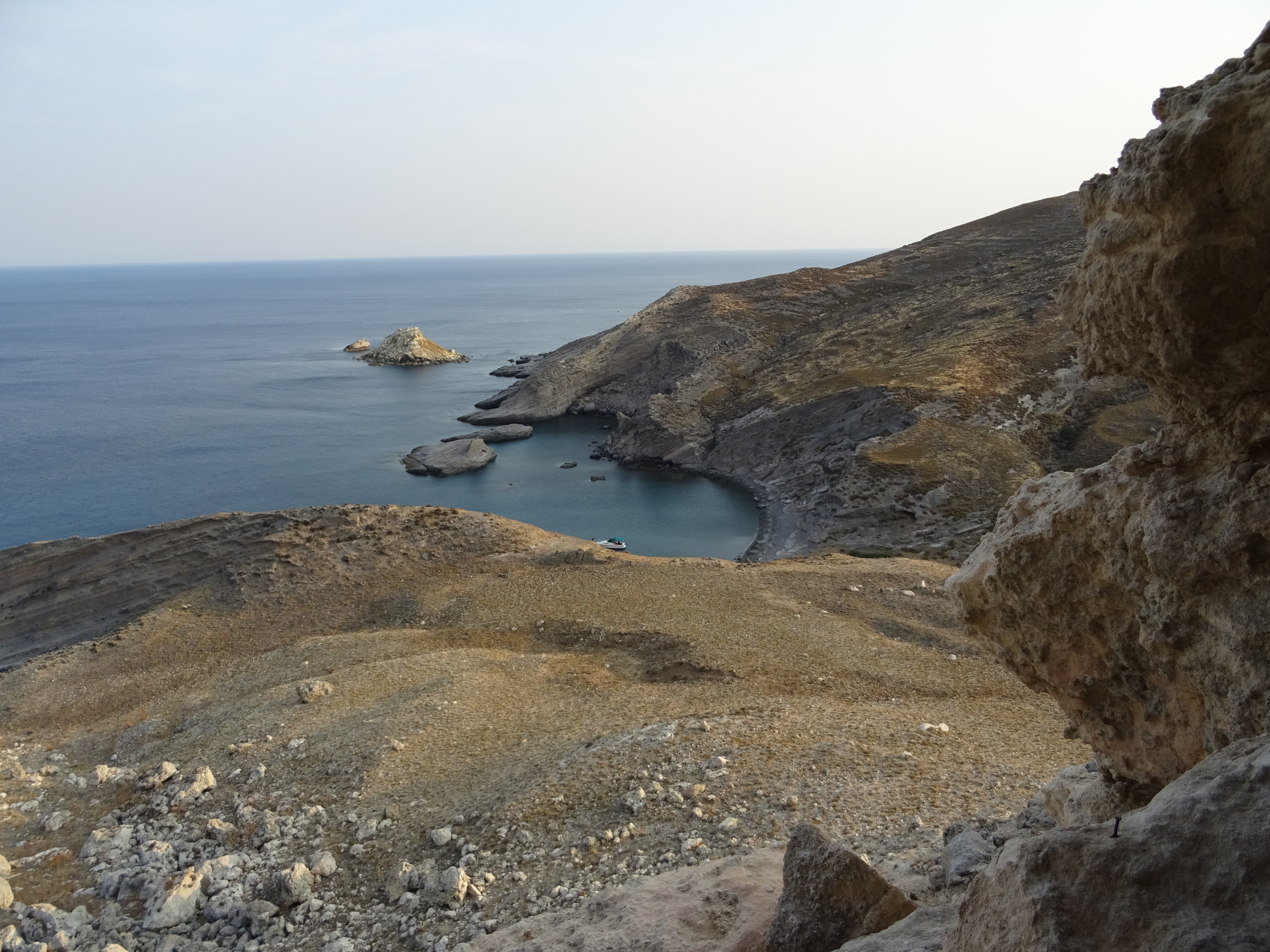
Alonitsi beach
