= Myrina, Greece =

Capital of Lemnos, Greece

Myrina Μύρινα
- Municipal unit
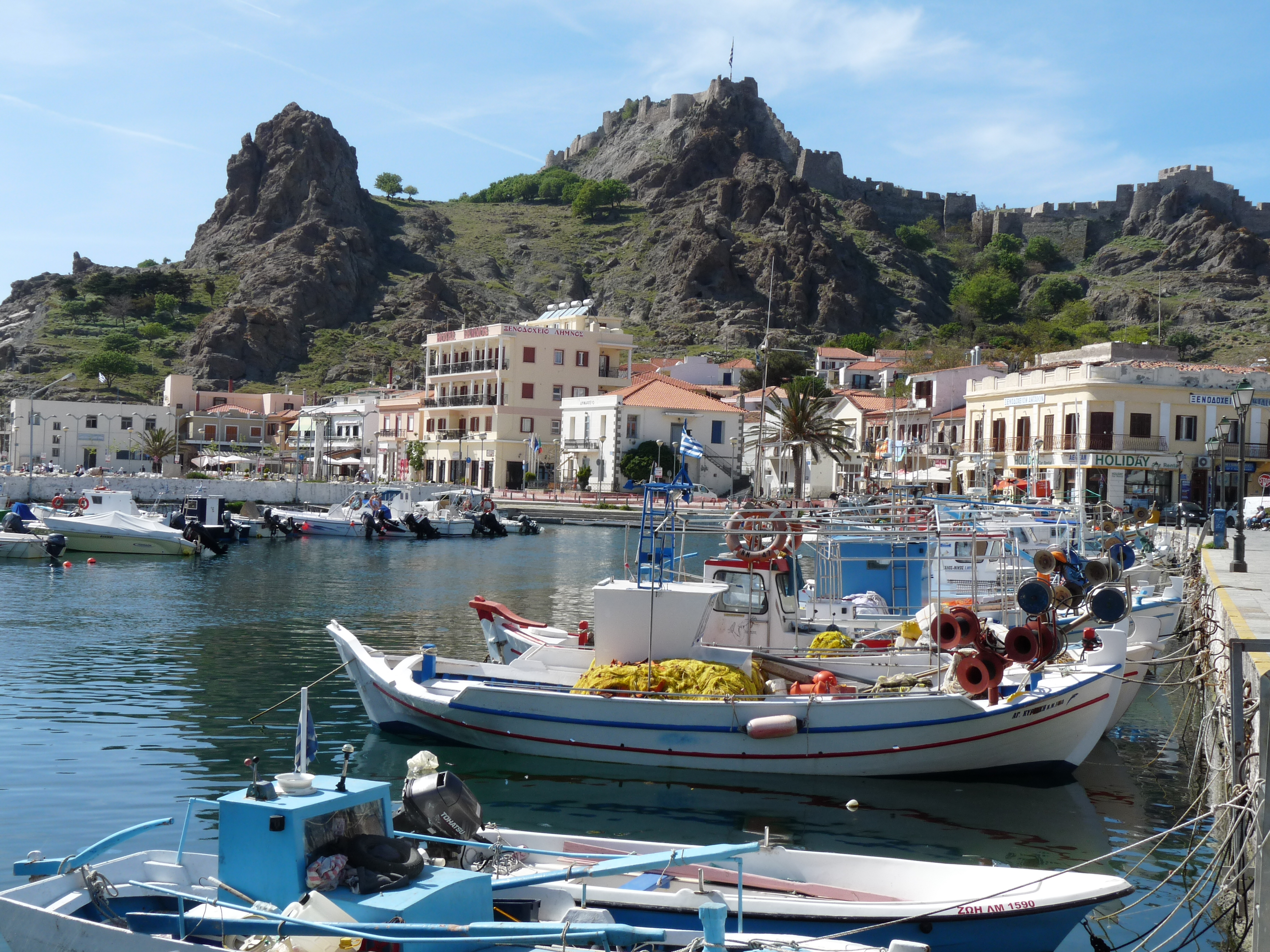
- View of the promenade with the fortress

- Location within the regional unit

- Location within Greece
- Coordinates: 39°53′N 25°04′E
- Country: Greece
- Administrative region: North Aegean
- Regional unit: Lemnos
- Municipality: Lemnos

Area
  - Municipal unit: 82.0 km^{2} (31.7 sq mi)

Population (2021)
  - Municipal unit: 8,518
  - Municipal unit density: 104/km^{2} (269/sq mi)
  - Community: 6,190
- Time zone: UTC+2 (EET)
  - Summer (DST): UTC+3 (EEST)
- Vehicle registration: MH

Myrina (Greek: Μύρινα [ˈmiɾina], Ancient Greek: [mýrina]) is a town and a municipal unit on the island of Lemnos, Greece, serving as its capital. The town has a population of 6,190, while the municipal unit includes multiple nearby villages adding up to a population of 8,518 (according to the 2021 census). Prior to the 2011 local government reform it used to be its own municipality, after which it was incorporated into the newly formed municipality of Lemnos.

== Climate ==
The climate in Lemnos is mainly Mediterranean. Myrina has a hot summer Mediterranean climate (Köppen: Csa). The winters are generally mild, but there is occasionally a snowfall. Strong winds are a feature of the island, especially in August and in winter time, hence its nickname "the wind-ridden one" (in Greek, Ανεμόεσσα). The temperature is typically 2 to 5 degrees Celsius less than in Athens, especially in summertime. Myrina is relatively dry, due to the rain shadow caused by the Pindus Mountains.

Climate data for Myrina
Month	Jan	Feb	Mar	Apr	May	Jun	Jul	Aug	Sep	Oct	Nov	Dec	Year
Record high °C (°F)	21.8 (71.2)	22.0 (71.6)	24.0 (75.2)	25.8 (78.4)	29.8 (85.6)	34.4 (93.9)	39.4 (102.9)	38.8 (101.8)	32.8 (91.0)	31.2 (88.2)	24.0 (75.2)	22.2 (72.0)	39.4 (102.9)
Mean daily maximum °C (°F)	12.7 (54.9)	12.9 (55.2)	14.9 (58.8)	17.3 (63.1)	21.9 (71.4)	26.8 (80.2)	29.0 (84.2)	29.2 (84.6)	26.2 (79.2)	21.1 (70.0)	16.3 (61.3)	13.5 (56.3)	20.2 (68.3)
Daily mean °C (°F)	10.3 (50.5)	10.5 (50.9)	12.0 (53.6)	14.1 (57.4)	18.1 (64.6)	23.1 (73.6)	25.5 (77.9)	25.6 (78.1)	23.1 (73.6)	18.1 (64.6)	13.3 (55.9)	11.3 (52.3)	17.1 (62.8)
Mean daily minimum °C (°F)	7.7 (45.9)	7.7 (45.9)	9.6 (49.3)	10.8 (51.4)	14.8 (58.6)	18.8 (65.8)	21.7 (71.1)	21.8 (71.2)	19.4 (66.9)	14.4 (57.9)	11.1 (52.0)	9.1 (48.4)	13.9 (57.0)
Record low °C (°F)	−5.0 (23.0)	−4.2 (24.4)	−2.0 (28.4)	4.0 (39.2)	7.4 (45.3)	12.4 (54.3)	14.0 (57.2)	14.8 (58.6)	12.8 (55.0)	8.6 (47.5)	2.0 (35.6)	−3.6 (25.5)	−5.0 (23.0)
Average precipitation mm (inches)	72.3 (2.85)	44.1 (1.74)	51.6 (2.03)	32.3 (1.27)	23.3 (0.92)	21.9 (0.86)	10.3 (0.41)	7.5 (0.30)	19.6 (0.77)	35.9 (1.41)	75.4 (2.97)	80.2 (3.16)	474.4 (18.68)
Average precipitation days (≥ 1.0 mm)	7.5	6.2	5.2	4.2	3.4	2.6	1.2	1.2	1.6	3.8	7.0	8.4	52.3
Average relative humidity (%)	77.0	75.4	75.9	73.4	68.8	61.0	57.6	62.5	66.8	72.8	77.9	78.6	70.6
Source: NOAA

== History ==
The historian Strabo held that Amazons founded a city named Myrina, but which could also have been the one in Mysia. According to Herodotus, when the Chersonese on the Hellespont came under Athens' rule, Miltiades the son of Cimon came from Elaeus on the Chersonese to Lemnos where he proclaimed the Pelasgians must submit. The Hephaestians obeyed, giving up their city, but the Myrinaeans from the city Myrina would not be as easily pursued until they too submitted to Athens, thus given control of the island to Miltiades and the Athenians. (Herodotus: The Histories (ed. A. D. Godley, 1920), Cambridge. Harvard University Press. Cited February 2004 from The Perseus Project)

The ancient town also garnered notice of Pliny the Elder who wrote that the shadow of Mount Athos could be seen in the town's forum on the summer solstice. Other authors of antiquity who note the town include Ptolemy and Stephanus of Byzantium.

== The town of Myrina ==
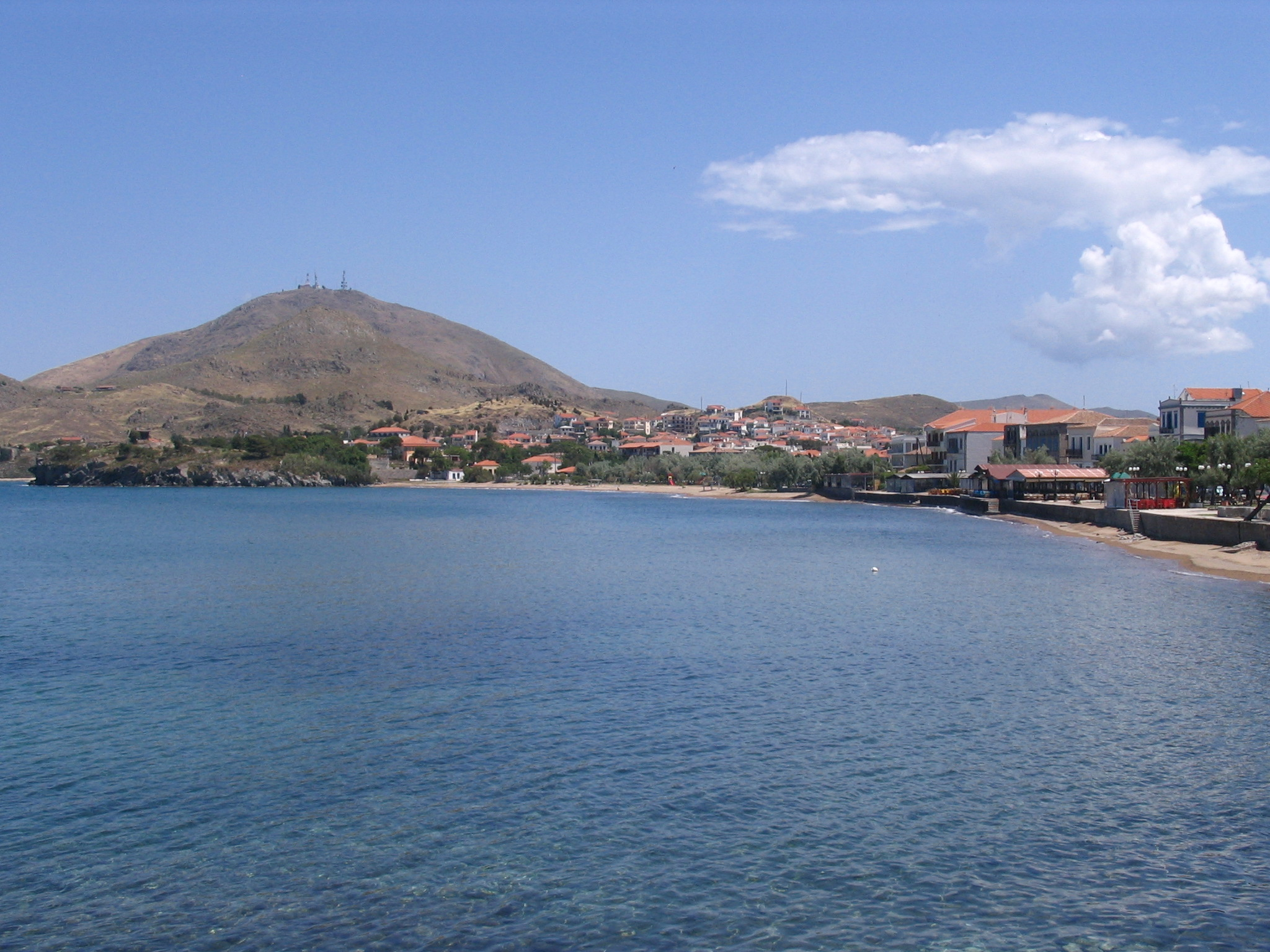
View of the town's beach

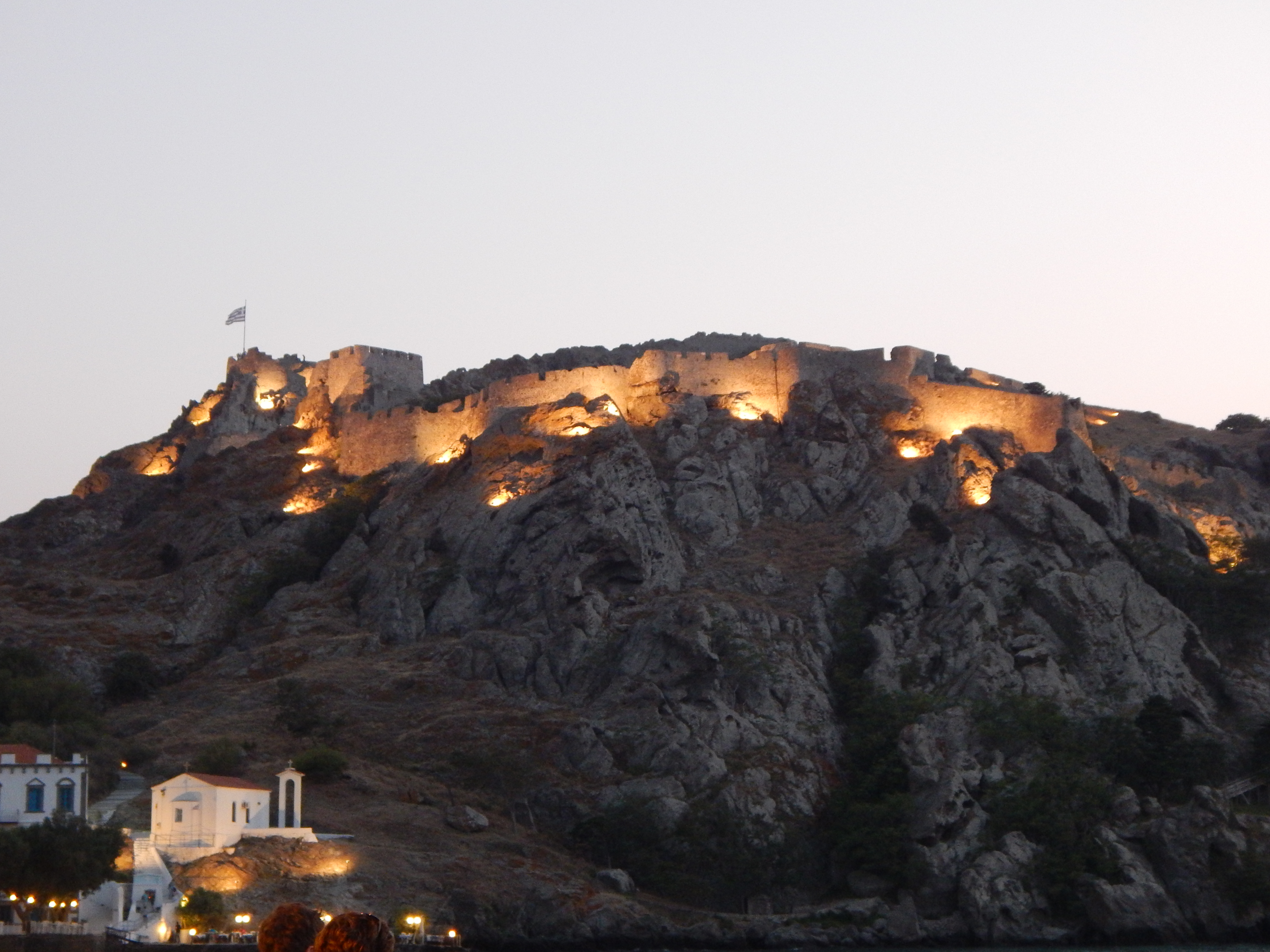
The castle at night

Modern day Myrina is built upon a shallow bay split into two by a promontory jutting out to sea and carrying the ruins of a Venetian castle. To the north of the promontory lies the so-called Roman Shore (in Greek, Ρωμέικος Γιαλός), along which the Greek community had their homes during Ottoman times (until the Capture of Lemnos in 1912, during the First Balkan War). The name "Roman" dates to the East Roman or Byzantine Empire, when Greeks were called Romans (Ρωμιοί). To the south of the promontory lies the Turkish Shore (Τούρκικος Γιαλός), along which the Turkish community similarly had their homes, before the exchange of populations between Greece and Turkey.

In 2001 the town had 3,022 regular dwellings, of which 30.4% were stone-built, and 75.6% had pitched roofs made of red tiles (source: 18.3.2001 Census, National Statistical Service of Greece).

== Town quarters ==
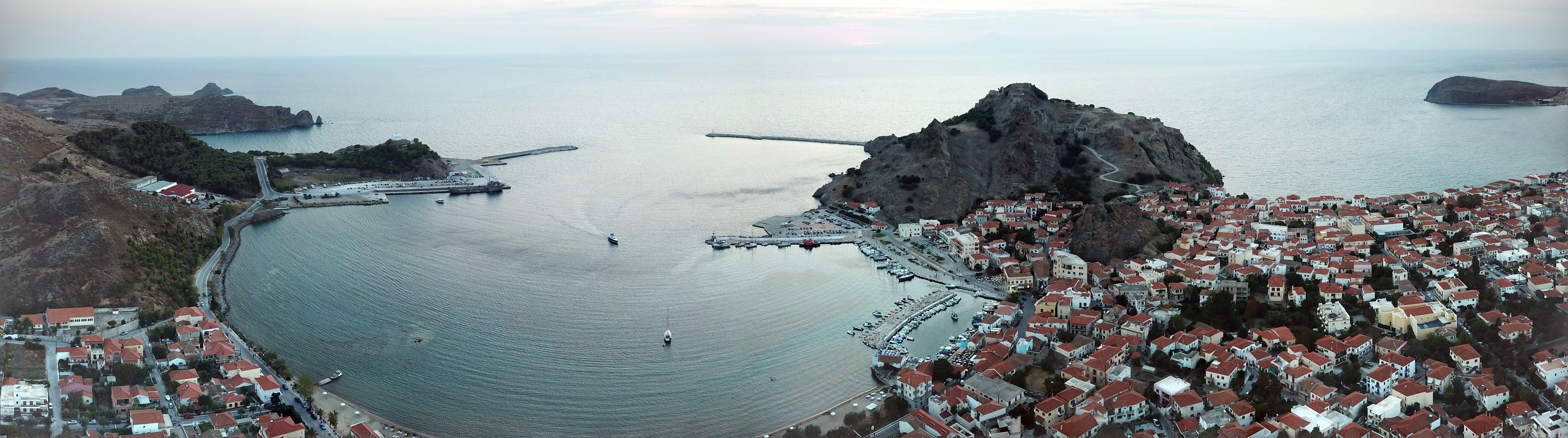
Panoramic view of the town

Behind the fronts of the two Shores, the town is divided into 4 parts: the old town core (encompassing the aforementioned Shores), referred to as Kastro (after the Castle atop the promontory); Androni, to the north (where the women of prehistoric Lemnos are said to have drugged their men before tossing them from the cliff of Petasos (the north horn of the bay of Myrina)); Tchas (most probably from the Russian word часовой, which means sentinel, sentry, or guard, because there was a Russian garrison stationed there for a short time at the end of the 18th century; less probably from the Russian word час, which means hour), just behind the harbour area; and Nea Madetos, a new (post-1980) settlement of workers´and fishermen's houses on the hill overlooking the Turkish shore from the south. The heart of the town is the market street, running north to south, and joining the Roman Shore to the Turkish Shore. Other landmarks are the OTE (Hellenic Telecoms Organisation) square, also called the bank square because it is the hub of all bank branches of the island, halfway along the market street, and the Perivola square, behind the Roman Shore, where the Lemnos bus station is (providing bus service from Myrina to the villages and back). The Town Hall building is located in the harbour, near the Port Authority building. Myrina also boasts a good provincial hospital, in the Tchas quarter, while presently is in the process of modernising its sewage system.

== Town features ==
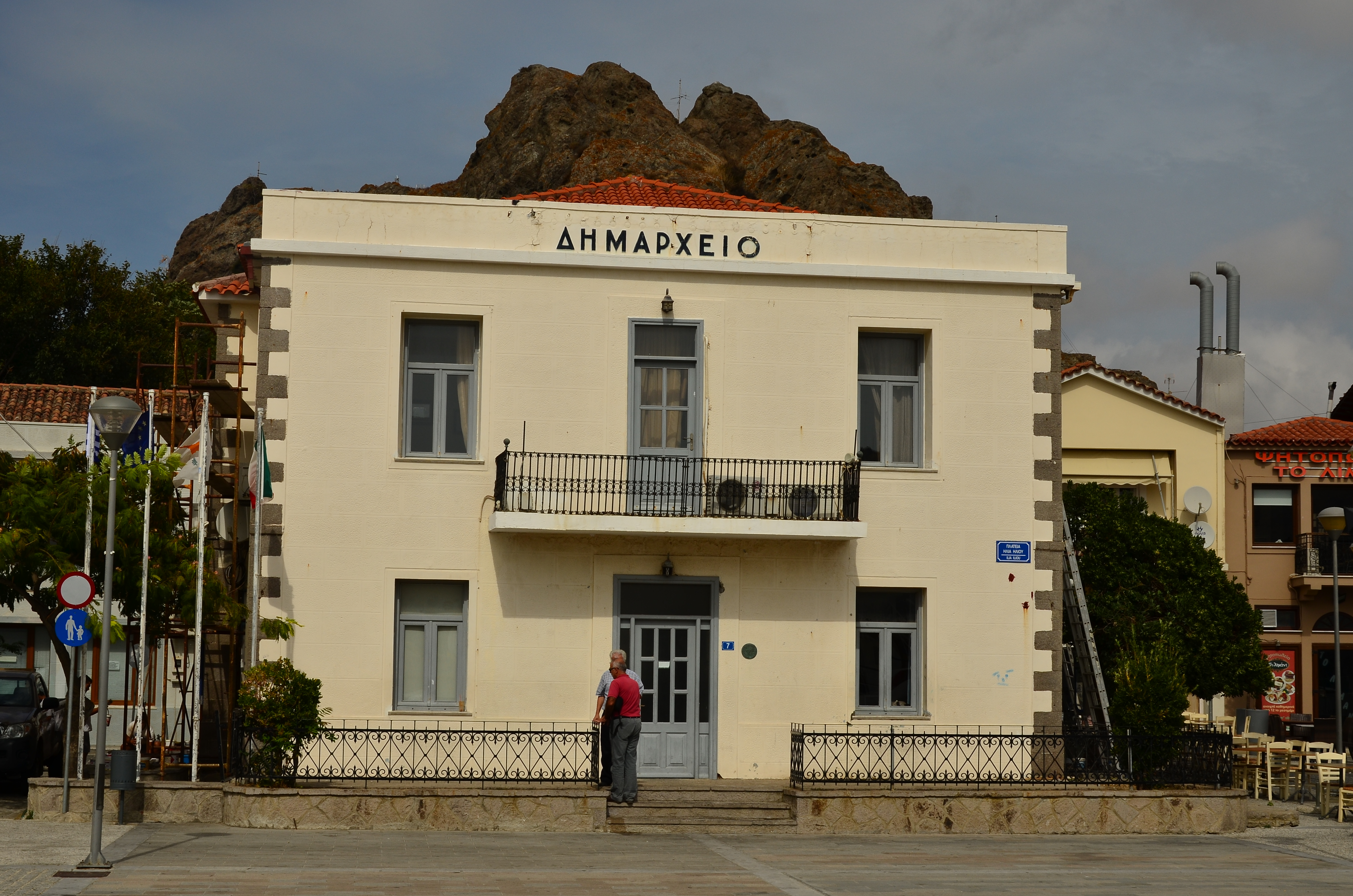
Town hall

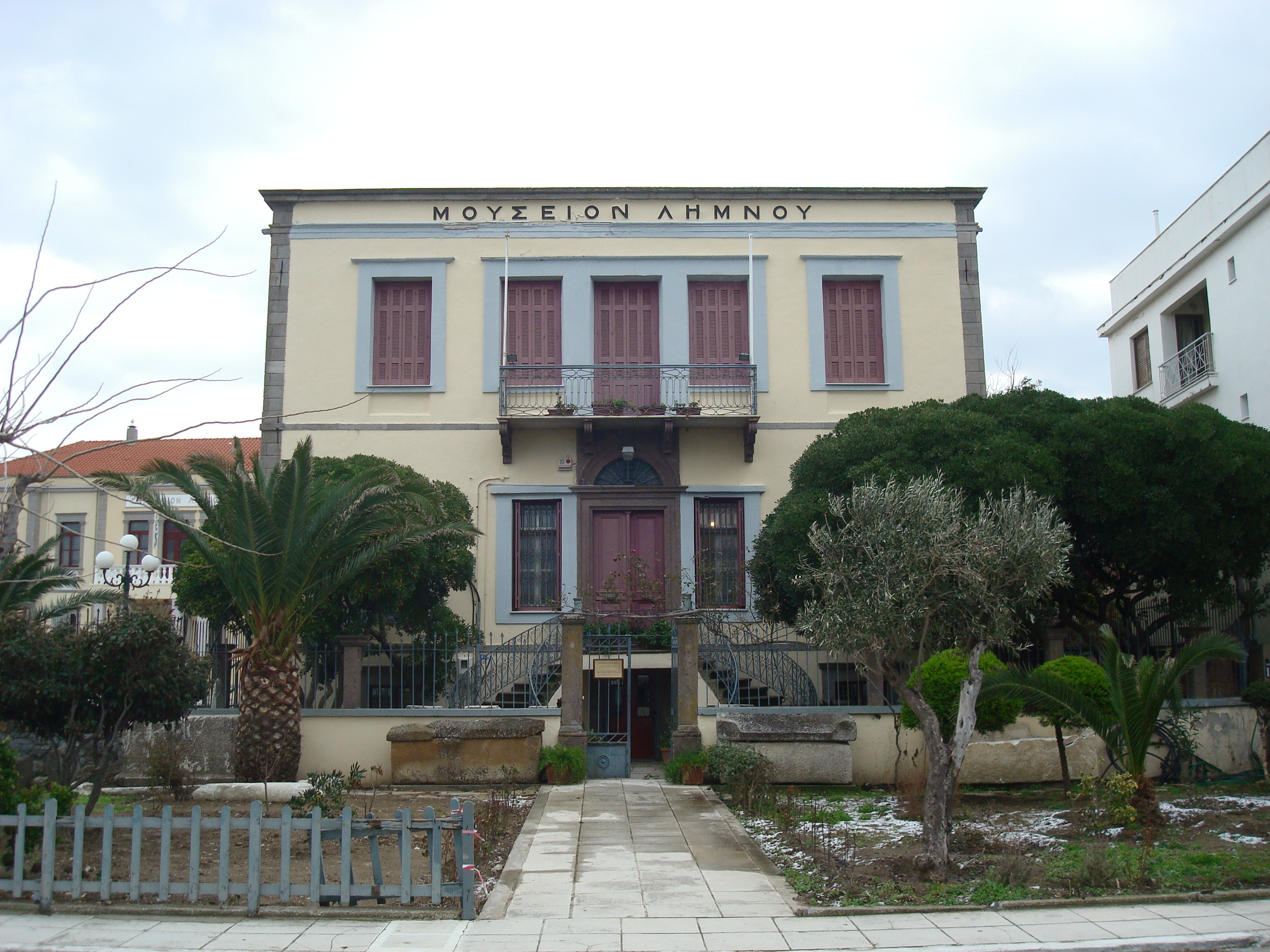
Archaeological museum of Lemnos.

Many of the town's streets are stone-paved alleys. The Roman Shore in particular is quite beautiful, aligned as it is with stone-built houses of neoclassical design (built from the mid-19th to the early 20th century), where the island's rich Greeks lived (many of the houses are still occupied by the descendants of those Greeks, most of whom made their fortunes as businessmen in British Egypt, part of the Greek diaspora there). The archaeological museum displays numerous exhibits from the island's remote (mostly prehistoric) past. With its clean, long, and sandy beaches, and its own Castle to boot, Myrina is a tourist attraction. Visitors and locals like bathing in the Roman Shore (or the Shallow Waters (in Greek, Ρηχά Νερά) beach, adjacent to the Roman Shore on the north), and having dinner at one of the fish taverns circling the traditional harbour in the Turkish Shore, enjoying the caiques there and a view of the castle at night. During the summer Myrina holds various outside theatrical and musical events.

== Administration ==
Since the 2011 Kallikratis Programme, Myrina has been a municipal unit of the municipality of Lemnos, serving as its seat. Prior to that, it used to be its own municipality covering the same land area. The municipal unit of Myrina includes multiple nearby villages and is split into five communities: Myrina, Kaspakas, Platy, Thanos, and Kornos. Together, they have a population of 8,518 (according to the 2021 census) and a land area of 82.049 square kilometres (31.679 sq mi), approximately 17.2% of the island.

== Notable people ==
- Ilias Iliou (1904–1985), politician
- Rallis Kopsidis (1929-2010), painter and writer
- Maria Lampadaridou-Pothou (1933-2023), novelist, poet, and playwright
- Panagiotis Magdanis (1990- ), Olympic rower
