= North Aegean =

Administrative region of Greece

North Aegean Περιφέρεια Βορείου Αιγαίου
- Administrative region
- Logo

- Coordinates: 38.7°N 26.0°E
- Country: Greece
- Decentralized Administration: Aegean
- Capital: Mytilene
- Regional units: List: Chios; Ikaria; Lemnos; Lesbos; Samos

Government
  - Governor: Kostas Moutzouris (New Democracy)

Area
  - Total: 3,835.91 km^{2} (1,481.05 sq mi)

Population (2021)
  - Total: 194,943
  - Density: 50.8205/km^{2} (131.625/sq mi)

GDP
  - Total: €3.121 billion (2024)
  - Per capita: €15,077 (2024)
- Time zone: UTC+2 (EET)
  - Summer (DST): UTC+3 (EEST)
- ISO 3166 code: GR-K
- HDI (2023): 0.882 very high · 11th of 13
- Website: www.pvaigaiou.gov.gr

The North Aegean Region (Greek: Περιφέρεια Βορείου Αιγαίου, romanized: Periféreia Voreíou Aigaíou [periˈferia voˈriu eˈʝeu]) is one of the thirteen administrative regions of Greece. It comprises the islands of the north-eastern Aegean Sea, called the North Aegean islands, except for Thasos and Samothrace, which belong to the Greek region of Eastern Macedonia and Thrace, and Imbros and Tenedos, which belong to Turkey.

== Administration ==
The North Aegean region was established in the 1987 administrative reform. With the 2010 Kallikratis plan, its powers and authority were redefined and extended. Along with the Southern Aegean region, it is supervised by the Decentralized Administration of the Aegean based at Piraeus. The capital of the region is situated in Mytilene on the island of Lesbos.

Until the Kallikratis reform, the region consisted of the three prefectures of Samos, Chios and Lesbos. Since 1 January 2011, it has been divided into five regional units: Chios, Ikaria, Lemnos, Lesbos, and Samos. The total number of islands in the North Aegean region are nine: Lesbos, Chios, Psara, Oinousses, Ikaria, Fournoi Korseon, Lemnos, Agios Efstratios and Samos.

== Major communities ==
- Chíos (Χίος)
- Kalloní (Καλλονή)
- Karlóvasi (Καρλόβασι)
- Mýrina (Μύρινα)
- Mytilíni (Μυτιλήνη)
- Omiroúpoli (Ομηρούπολη)
- Pythagóreio (Πυθαγόρειο)
- Sámos (Σάμος)

== Demographics ==
The region has shrunk by 5,095 people between 2011 and 2021, experiencing a population loss of 2.6%.

== Economy ==
The region's Gross domestic product (GDP) was €2.5 billion in 2018, accounting for 1.4% of Greek economic output. GDP per capita adjusted for purchasing power was €14,200 or 47% of the EU27 average in the same year. The GDP per employee was 67% of the EU average. North Aegean is the region in Greece with the lowest GDP per capita and one of the poorest regions in the EU.
