= Lemnos (regional unit) =

Lemnos Περιφερειακή ενότητα Λήμνου
- Regional unit
- Municipalities of Lemnos and Lesbos

- Lemnos within Greece

- Location within Greece
- Coordinates: 39°55′N 25°10′E
- Country: Greece
- Administrative region: North Aegean
- Seat: Myrina

Area
  - Total: 520.9 km^{2} (201.1 sq mi)

Population (2021)
  - Total: 16,668
  - Density: 32.00/km^{2} (82.88/sq mi)
- Time zone: UTC+2 (EET)
  - Summer (DST): UTC+3 (EEST)
- Postal code: 814 xx, 815 00

Lemnos (Greek: Περιφερειακή ενότητα Λήμνου) is one of the regional units of Greece. It is part of the region of North Aegean. The regional unit covers the islands of Lemnos, Agios Efstratios and a few smaller, uninhabited islands, in the Aegean Sea.

== Administration ==
As a part of the 2011 Kallikratis government reform, the regional unit Lemnos was created out of part of the former Lesbos Prefecture. It is subdivided into 2 municipalities. These are (number as in the map in the infobox):

- Lemnos (3)
- Agios Efstratios (2)

=== Province ===
The province of Lemnos (Greek: Επαρχία Λήμνου) was one of the provinces of the Lesbos Prefecture. It had the same territory as the present regional unit. It was abolished in 2006.
