= Agios Alexandros =

Agios Alexandros Άγιος Αλέξανδρος
- Settlement
- Location within Greece
- Coordinates: 39°57.8′N 25°22′E
- Country: Greece
- Administrative region: North Aegean
- Regional unit: Lemnos
- Municipality: Lemnos
- Municipal unit: Moudros
- Community: Kontopouli

Population (2021)
  - Total: 4
- Time zone: UTC+2 (EET)
  - Summer (DST): UTC+3 (EEST)

Agios Alexandros (Greek: Άγιος Αλέξανδρος) is a settlement in the northeastern part of the Aegean island of Lemnos, Greece. It is part of the municipal unit of Moudros and the community of Kontopouli. The population was 4 at the 2021 census. It is located north of the Alyki Lagoon, 4 km southwest of Panagia and 5 km northeast of Kontopouli.

== Population ==
Year	Population
1951	87
1961	76
1981	1
1991	5
2001	13
2011	0
2021	4

== Archaeological sites ==
Agios Alexandros was the most important of a series of villages that existed before in the extended region of Kontopouli, most of which are currently uninhabited. The former Monastery of Chloe was mentioned in a patriarchal document of 1320. The name survived in the nearby promontory of Chloi, west of Agios Alexandros, opposite the ancient city Hephaistia. Here was the ancient sanctuary of the Kaveiron, which was excavated during the 1960s. Possibly, the Christian monastery of Chloe was founded at the site of the ancient sanctuary, which was common in Byzantine times.

In a nearby sea cave prehistoric remains have been found. The cave is commonly called the Cave of Philoctetes although the location is not compatible with the ancient literary sources.

== History ==
The village probably took its name from Saint Alexander, the patron saint of Lemnos according to manuscripts of the 15th century. The name of the saint survived as the name of the settlement, even though there is no church of Saint Alexander in the village. The main church of the settlement is dedicated to Saint Pachomius.

By the mid-19th century, the area north of Kontopouli was uninhabited. In 1858, the German traveller Conze In 1858 the German traveler Conze found cultivation in major parts of the plain between Cape Plaka and Kontopouli but no settlement. There were only isolated huts, which locals called estates. When the estates passed into Christian ownership, settlements started to develop around them. One of them was Agios Alexandros, first marked on the 1904 map of Fredrich.

It had 34 inhabitants in 1951, 87 in 1961. Between 1959 and 1973 a small public school was operated in the settlement. The school also served pupils from nearby agricultural settlement: Dimosia, Agios Georgios Amniou, Neftina, Saravari and Geranos. It had 32 pupils in 1961. The rise of cotton production in the area brought prosperity to the area, but the decline of cotton production in the 1970s led to mass emigration. It had only one inhabitant in 1981. Presently most inhabitants only spend the summer months in the village.

== See also ==
- List of settlements in the Lemnos regional unit

== Sources ==
- Vassiliki Tourptsoglou-Stefanidou: Journeys and Geographic Sources of the Island of Lemnos (15th-20th Centuries)
- Belitsos, Theodoros, Lemnos and its villages by Th. Belitsos 1994.
- Lemnos/Limnos Province CD Rom (Cdrom Επαρχείου Λήμνου = CD Rom Eparcheiou Limnou): Lovable Lemnos
- Belitsos, Theodoros: Historic route in Lemnos: Livadochori, Lemnos Newspapers, p 531 (June 10, 2008).
