= Plaka, Lemnos =

Plaka Πλάκα
- Community
- Location within Greece
- Coordinates: 40°00′17″N 25°25′39″E
- Country: Greece
- Administrative region: North Aegean
- Regional unit: Lemnos
- Municipality: Lemnos
- Municipal unit: Moudros

Population (2021)
  - Community: 309
- Time zone: UTC+2 (EET)
  - Summer (DST): UTC+3 (EEST)

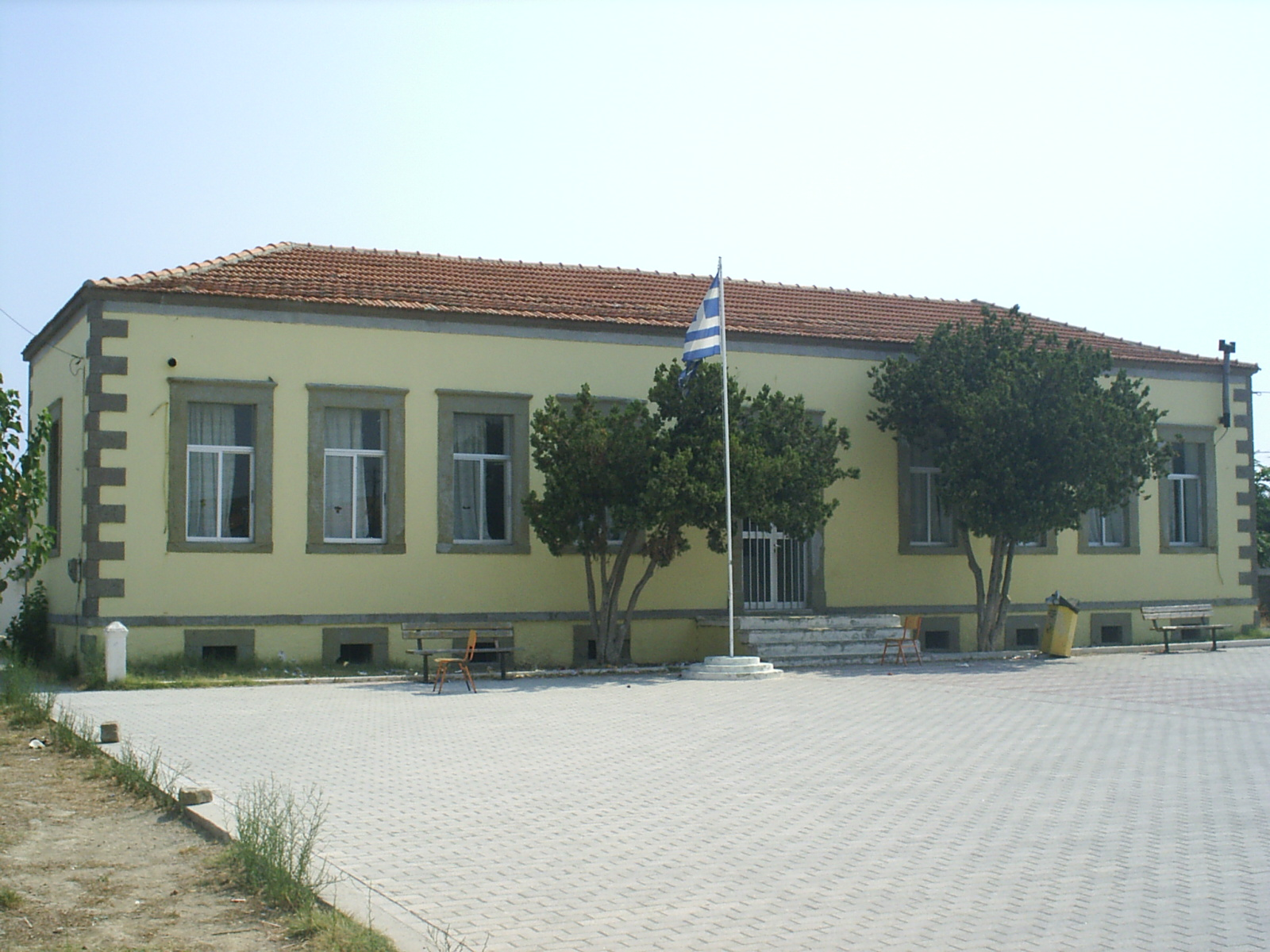
The school of Plaka, Limnos

Plaka (Greek: Πλάκα) is a village in the northeasternmost part of the island of Lemnos, Greece. It is part of the municipal unit of Moudros. The island of Imbros in Turkey is just 24 km northeast. It is situated somewhere in the middle of the straight line between Troy and Mount Athos. Some believe that it is the Ermaion lepas of the ancient, through which was transmitted with fire the news of the sack of Troy to Argos and Mycenae. Although the edge has an elevation of just 70 m, the cape comes deep into the sea and it is easily seen from those two areas. Therefore, in 1912 a 30 m high rotating lighthouse was built with a luminous range of 20 nautical miles (37 km).

Plaka takes its name from the nearby cape Plaka, the northeasternmost point of Lemnos. The cape was mentioned by older travellers under different names: Palaqa burnu (Piri Reis 1521), Blava (Belon 1548, Dapper 1688, Choiseul-Gouffier 1788, Lacroix 1858) and Plaka (Conze 1858, Tozer 1859, De Launay 1894, Hauttecoeur 1903, Fredrich 1904).

== Archaeological sites ==
=== Axia ===
The currently deserted medieval settlement of Axia (Αξιά) or Naxa (Νάξα) is situated between the villages of Panagia and Plaka. It was mentioned in 1321 as "Agioi Anargyroi eis tin Nakissan". According to Argyrios Moschidis its name is derived from the ancient area of Akesa (Άκεσα), named after the verb akeomai: regain my health, recover by Philoctetes who was said to be cured there from a snake bite.

A monastery was later built at the site dedicated to the "Agioi Anargyroi" (Holy Unmercenaries). In the area coins and pottery were found and thereby was characterized as an archeological site. Angelis Michelis mentions an old pier. Further north in the locality Rousounia (Ρουσούνια) springs with radioactive water for bathing and mud baths are located. There was a chapel known as Agios Charalambos nearby. Sick people from all over Lemnos used to come here. Several decades ago expatriates from the USA built a new chapel of Agios Charalambos and a block of cells for the visitors.

=== Kastrin ===
A 1355 paper under the census of the Great Lavra Monastery in Athos mentioned that there was a fortified settlement known as Kastrin (Καστρίν) in the area around Plaka. Probably it is the same as the Kastrioti Castle where in 1459 Kritovoulos from Imbros landed and expelled the Venetians from the island.

In 1521, the Turkish admiral Piri Reis named it "Burun Hisãr", (literally the Castle of the Cape). He found it deserted because the inhabitants had resettled in Palaiokastro Myrina during the reign of Bayezid II (1481–1512).

This fortress was located at a tiny peninsula east of the village next to an old port. The ruins are now known as Palaiokastro or Vriokastro (Βριόκαστρο). As Vriokastro it is found in the maps of Conze (1858) and Fredrich (1904). Conze found it ruined. There were many cisterns in the internal, one of these still strong and in a wall he found an ancient inscription.

=== Chryse ===
In the southern part of the Vriokastro peninsula at a distance of 800 m from the coast and east of the shoal Vina, ruins of a sunken ancient city were found, examined by professor Moutsopoulos in 1969. He spotted a block of buildings with walls up to 2 meters, monolith lintels and stone paved roads. The complex is similar to the prehistoric settlement Poliochne. The ruins were first described in 1785 by Choiseul-Gouffier, who identified with the homeric island of Chryse.

Obviously in the past there was land to the east of the Plaka peninsula, which was either united with the mainland by a narrow panhandle or was a separate island. On this stretch of land was probably located the city of Chryse of the Homeric period—sunk in 197 BC—, its ruins now visible in the depths of the sea.

== History ==
The area around Plaka was at first a seasonal dwelling for inhabitants of Agios Ypatios and Palaiopoli (Hephaestia) who had farm land in the area. After 1823 several farmers began to live there permanently and established a settlement. Conze who visited the area in 1858 found only a few isolated huts, therefore he did not mark the village in his map. He found though a few people who led and guided him to Vriokastro. It was first mentioned as a village at the 1863 census: it had 60 families and the settlement was referred to as Plaka or Neochorion. In 1874 there were 70 families and 87 houses in the village, known then as "Symferoupoli". This name was given by the bishop Joachim III, referring to the interest (συμφέρον) of its residents who fled from Agios Ypatios. The name "Symferoupoli" was not used anymore after 1888 when bishop Joachim died. Since that time the name "Plaka" was used, and it was mentioned as such by the travellers De Launay (1894) and Fredrich (1904).

In 1870, the residents opened an informal school. In 1886, a school building was built together with the residents from Panagia. It became a community school in 1887. It had two classes, for further education the students had to go to Kontopouli. A new school building was built in 1928-1929. In 1938, the school had 107 students.

The church of Agios Dimitrios was built in 1896 at the location of an older church. The elaborately carved baroque reredos is older (late 18th century), and comes from the monastery of Lesbos.

The settlement grew steadily until the 1960s. In 1928 it had 518 inhabitants, in 1961 578. In the 1970s a gradual decline began. In 2021, the village had 309 inhabitants. Today, Plaka is still one of the most lively villages in the island. It has an active cultural association, that maintains the old customs. Together with the youth of Panagia a soccer club was founded, Aetos.

=== Population ===
Year	Population
1928	518
1961	578
1981	384
1991	365
2001	365
2011	310
2021	309

== Economy ==
Although isolated in an extremity of Lemnos, the village saw good economical development, mainly based on agriculture (cereals, cotton, livestock, honey), fishing and sponge diving. Until 1922, there was additional income from seasonal migration to and from the coast of Asia Minor.

== Events ==
The feast of Saint Charalampus and carnaval are celebrated every year. There is an annual meeting of former residents of Imbros at the chapel of Agia Anna. Plaka is only 12 nautical miles (20 km) from Imbros. Since the 1970s many former residents of Imbros came here to perceive the island from far. This gradually turned into an annual festival in Plaka with a revival of traditional Imbrian customs. For this purpose, the Saint Anne chapel was built in 2003.

== People ==
- Komninos Pyromaglou, politician, writer and historian (1899–1980), founder of EDES (ΕΔΕΣ) and member of the Parliament with EDA (ΕΔΑ) in 1958.
- Spyridon P. Pilitsis, one of the first Greek air pilot during the interwar period.
- Michael S. Pilitsis, General of the Greek Army, nephew of Piromaglou and Spyridon Pilitsis.

== Sites of interests ==
- Agios Dimitrios Church
- Agios Charalambos
- The lighthouse
- Vriokastro

== Bibliography ==
- Tourtsopoulou-Stefanidou Vasilili, Ταξιδιωτικά και γεωγραφικά κείμενα για τη νήσο Λήμνο (15ος-20ος αιώνας) = Travelling and Geographic Sources of Lemnos Island (15th–20th Centuries), Thessaloniki, 1986.
- Lemnos CD: Λήμνος αγαπημένη = Loveable Lemnos
- Theodoros Belitsos, Η Λήμνος και τα χωριά της = Lemnos and its Villages, 1994

== See also ==
- List of settlements in the Lemnos regional unit
