= Repanidi =

Repanidi Ρεπανίδι
- Community
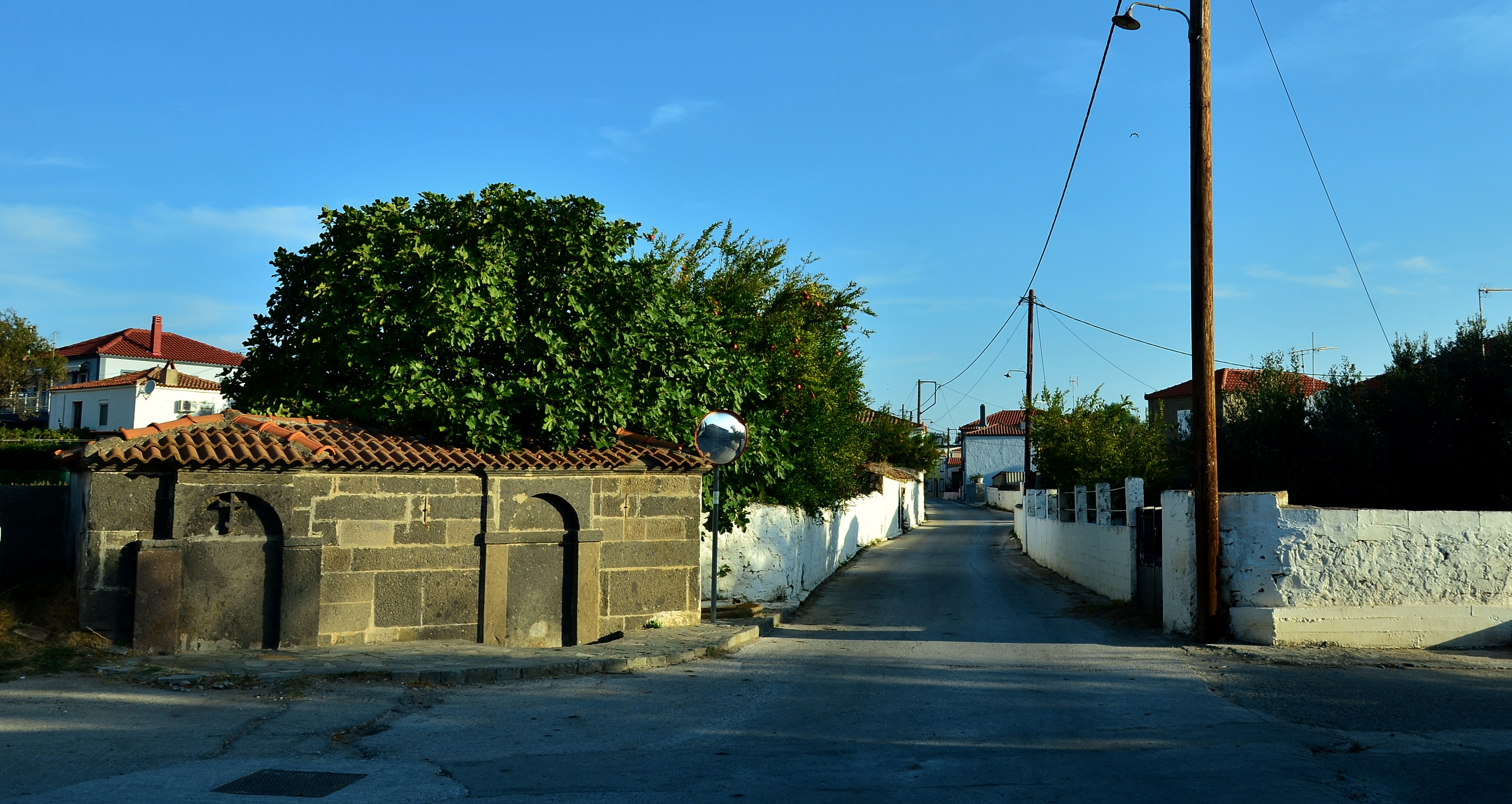
- A street

- Location within Greece
- Coordinates: 39°55.4′N 25°17.9′E
- Country: Greece
- Administrative region: North Aegean
- Regional unit: Lemnos
- Municipality: Lemnos
- Municipal unit: Moudros
- Elevation: 10 m (33 ft)

Population (2021)
  - Community: 209
- Time zone: UTC+2 (EET)
  - Summer (DST): UTC+3 (EEST)
- Vehicle registration: MY

Repanidi (Greek: Ρεπανίδι) is a village and a community in the northeast of the island of Lemnos, Greece. It is part of the municipal unit of Moudros. It is located 2 km northeast of Romanou, 3 km west of Kontopouli, 3 km east of Lychna, 6 km northeast of Moudros and 21 km northeast of Myrina. Its elevation is 30 m.

== Population ==
Year	Population
1928	639
1981	393
1991	302
2001	357
2011	266
2021	209

== History ==
The village was first mentioned as Repanidion in 1285 in a census record of the monastery Pteris, that was located near Tsimandria, southwestern Lemnos. Among others it had a chapel known as Odigitria. The name probably comes from a plant called "rapanida". In 1418, Buondelmonti mentioned the village as Rapagnidi. Belon wrote in 1548 that the village was situated near a port known as Ekato Kefalon (Εκατό Κεφαλών = "The Hundred Heads"). This port was also known to 16th-century Ottoman geographer Piri Reis.

This indicates that the village was not located in its present-day location, but near present Agios Ypatios. The move probably took place in the beginning of the 19th century.

=== 19th century ===
The New Martyr Athanasios Repanidiotis, who had an eventful life, came from Repanidi. In the village a school was opened in the 1820s. In 1875, the school building was built and in 1879, the school became communal. It had two classes at first, then increased to five classes before 1912. In 1856, 147 men aged 18 to 60 paid 4,704 kuruş to avoid army conscription. Both in 1863 and in 1874, 94 Christian families were recorded. In 1874 it had 118 houses. The majority were employed in agriculture. In the final years of Turkish rule, a post office was opened. Repanidi had one representative in the regional council.

=== Modern years ===
During the interwar years, the village saw a small growth. In 1928, the population was 639 people. In 1931 a new school building was built with funding from the Repanidioiti Council of the USA "Agios Georgios. It was operated until 1990, when it united with the school in Kontopouli. Since 2006, the school building houses Special Professional Education. Construction of the new church of Saint George was started in 1928, and completed in 1948. It is built out of stone with marble decorative elements. After World War II, due to immigration, the village population declined, reaching 302 in 1991. There is a cultural association and there used to be a soccer club AO Repanidiou. Kostas Zafeiriou, writer of children's books, descends from Repanidi. He wrote a book Paramythia gia tin Aithaleia kai alles istories, which is inspired by Lemnos.

== Localities ==
=== Agios Ypatios ===
Agios Ypatios (also known as Anypatis or Aypatis) is an old settlement 1.5 km northeast of Repanidi. It is situated in a fertile plain. It has only a few inhabitable houses, and no permanent residents. It was first mentioned in 1677 by Covel as Hagia-Pate. The village took its name from Saint Hypatius. There is no church of Saint Hypatius in the village, but there may have been one.

Turkish land owners had their residences in Agios Ypatios, and built a school and a mosque in the village. The population grew, and also Christians settled there and built the church of Saint Athanasius, which still exists today. In 1856 107 men aged 18–60 years paid 3424 kuruş tax, to escape the conscription. In the 1860s the Christian population moved away to the new villages Plaka and Panagia, and also to Kontopouli, Romanou and Repanidi. In 1904 the village was virtually deserted, also by the Turks. The most striking remains of the village are the Ottoman fountain and the church of Saint Athanasius.

=== Kotsinos ===
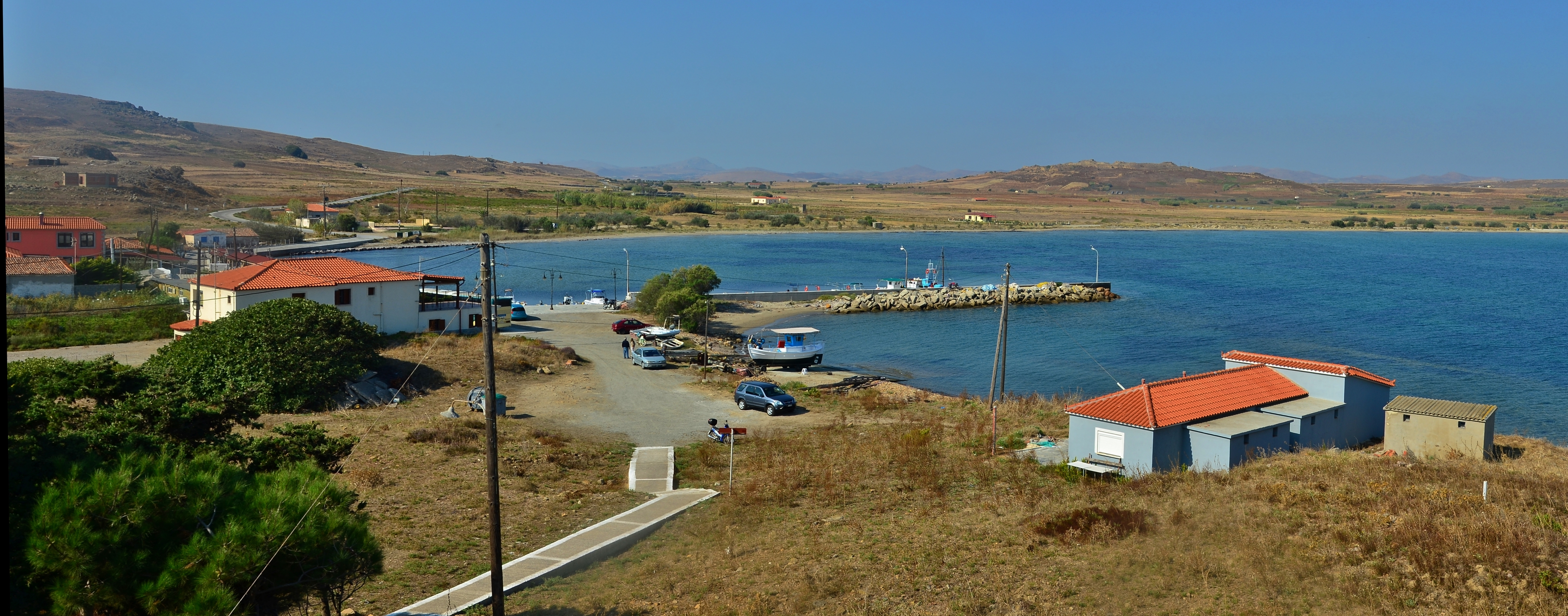
Kotsinos

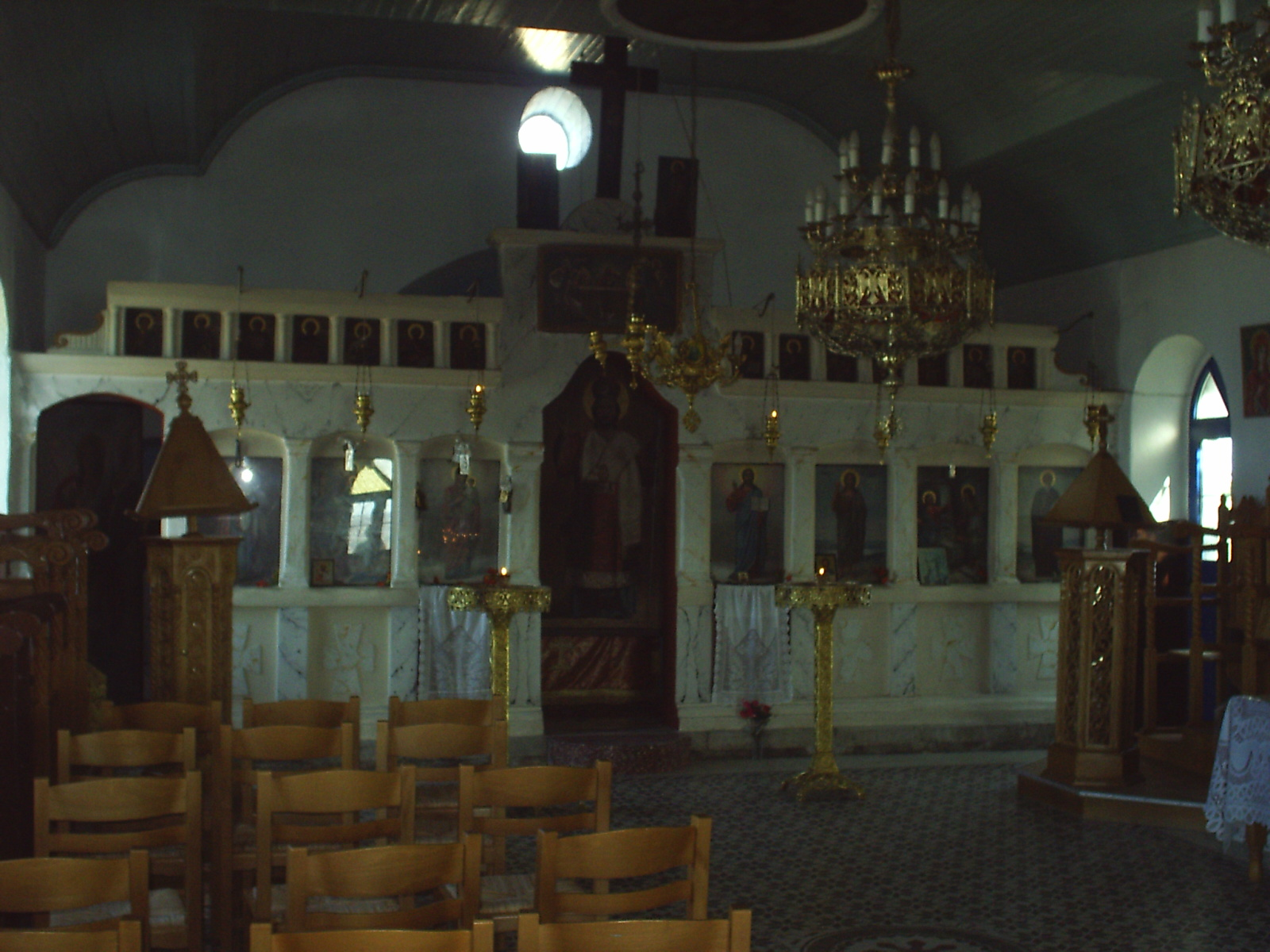
Interior of Zoodochos Pigi Church, Kotsinos

Kotsinos is a small fishing village 2.5 km northwest of Repanidi. Its name reflects the local pronunciation of the word "κόκκινος" (kokkinos), meaning "red", referring to the colour of the local soil. It was first mentioned in 1136. It was expanded by the Venetians in the 13th century, who built a castle. Nearby Hephaistia was abandoned in favour of Kotsinos. The village was recaptured by the Byzantines in 1276, and a monastery was built. When the Venetians captured the island again in 1464, Kotsinos was one of the three most important castles. In 1478 it was the site of a siege and was defended by the Venetian heroine and figure of legend Maroula of Lemnos. The castle was built on an artificial hill, and its ruins are still visible. Inside the castle there is the church of Zoodochos Pigi, built in 1954 on the remains of the monastery. There is a spring under the church.

In the first centuries of Ottoman rule, Kotsinos remained a flourishing trading port, but it declined after it was sacked by the Venetians in 1656. Most of its inhabitants moved to inland villages, and the port fell into disrepair. At the 2001 census, the village had 3 permanent inhabitants.

== Bibliography ==
- Tourtsopoulou-Stefanidou Vasilili, Ταξιδιωτικά και γεωγραφικά κείμενα για τη νήσο Λήμνο (15ος-20ος αιώνας) = Travelling and Geographic Sources of Lemnos Island (15th-20th Centuries) Thessaloniki, 1986.
- Lemnos CD: Λήμνος αγαπημένη = Loveable Lemnos
- Theodoros Belitsos, Η Λήμνος και τα χωριά της = Lemnos and its Villages, 1994
- Angelis Michelis Repanidi, Limnos, p 1019-1021 (November 11 to 25, 1934)

== See also ==
- List of settlements in the Lemnos regional unit
