= Kalliopi, Greece =

Kalliopi Καλλιόπη
- Community
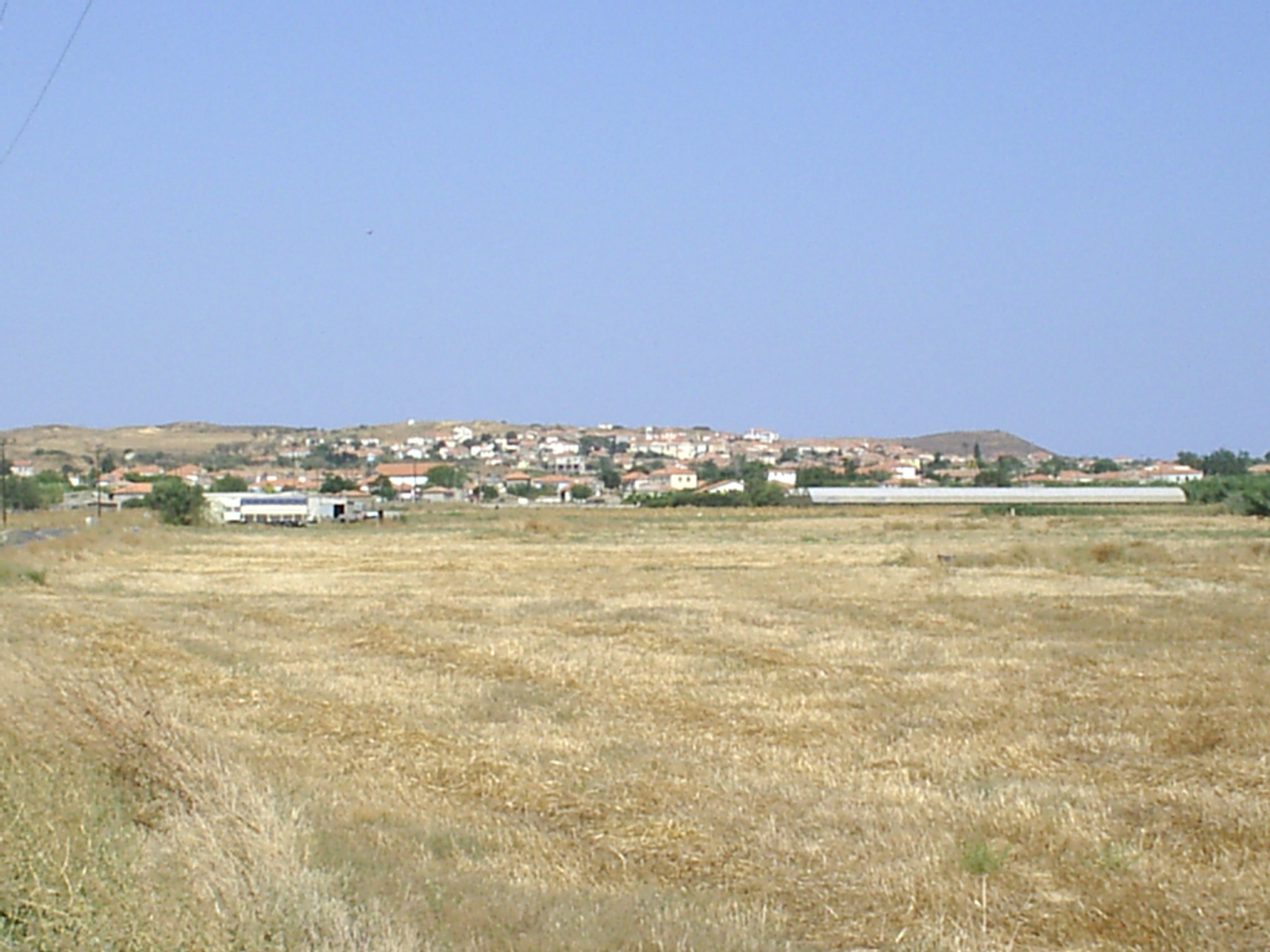

- Location within Greece
- Coordinates: 39°55′N 25°21′E
- Country: Greece
- Administrative region: North Aegean
- Regional unit: Lemnos
- Municipality: Lemnos
- Municipal unit: Moudros

Population (2021)
  - Community: 164
- Time zone: UTC+2 (EET)
  - Summer (DST): UTC+3 (EEST)

Kalliopi (Greek: Καλλιόπη) is a settlement in the municipal unit of Moudros, on the Greek island of Lemnos. It is situated in the eastern part of the island, 1 km southeast of Kontopouli and 1.5 km north of the lagoon Chortarolimni. The village's 3 km long beach is on the Keros Gulf. The gulf is east of the village and was an important port until the late Middle Ages. The name "Keros" meaning "horn" refers to its shape.

== Population ==
Year	Settlement population
1981	357
1991	359
2001	334
2011	207
2021	164

== History ==
The village was established around 1200. This may have coincided with the decline of the town Hephaistia. According to local folklore, the first settler was Kalliopi or Kalli, a rich resident of Hephaistia, who was expelled due to improper conduct. The settlement was formerly closer to the sea, near the present locality Ariones. The naval general Georgios Kapetanakis, active in the Greek War of Independence, came from Kalliopi.

== See also ==
- List of settlements in the Lemnos regional unit

== Sources ==
- Tourptsoglou-Stefanidou Vassiliki, Voyages and Geographical Sources From Lemnos Island (15th-20th Centuries) (Ταξιδιωτικά και γεωγραφικά κείμενα για τη νήσο Λήμνο (15ος-20ος αιώνας) = Taxidiotika ke geografika kimena yia ti niso Limno (15os-20os eonas))
- Belitsos, Theodoros, Lemnos and its villages by Th. Belitsos 1994.
- Lemnos Province CD Rom (Cdrom Επαρχείου Λήμνου = CD Rom Eparcheiou Limnou): Lovable Lemnos
- Belitsos, Theodoros: Historic route in Lemnos: Livadochori, Lemnos Newspapers, p 531 (June 10, 2008).
