= Chortarolimni =

- Mylou Lake, Komi Lake
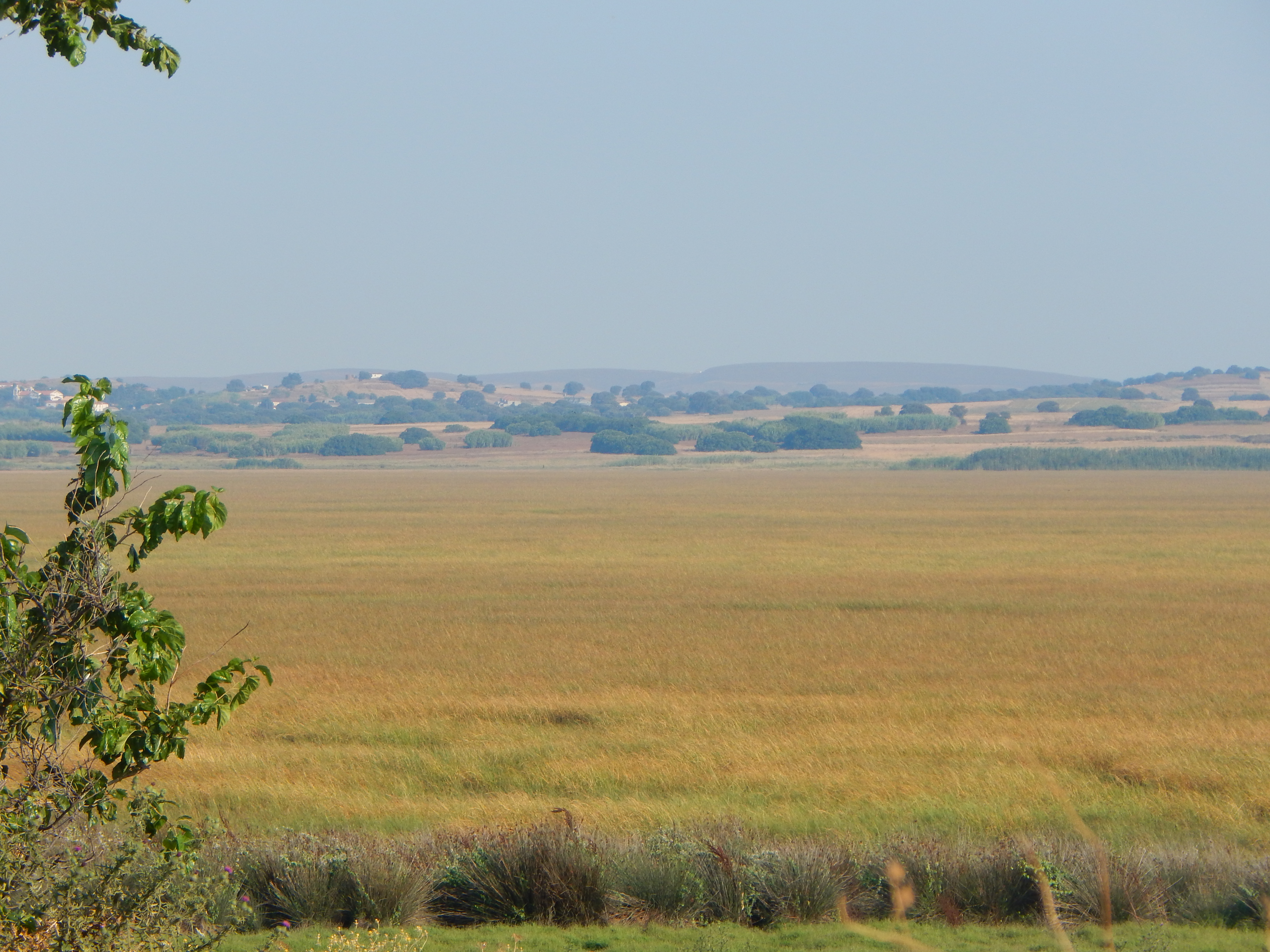

- Location within Greece
- Location: Lemnos, Greece
- Coordinates: 39.901°N 25.335°E
- Type: Lagoon

Chortarolimni (Greek: Χορταρόλιμνη meaning "weed lake") is a lagoon located in the East of the island Lemnos, Greece. Nearby villages includes Kalliopi to the north, Roussopouli to the southwest and Romano to the west. The area is 2.30 km^{2}. The lagoon is dry during the summer months.

The lake was once known as Mylou Lake (1738 Pococke) and Komi Lake (1858 Conze). Together with Alyki near Kontopouli and a third small lake Asprolimni, it forms a great ecosystem, where many migrating birds spend the winter.
