= Maria Lampadaridou-Pothou =

Greek writer (1933–2023)

- Μαρία Λαμπαδαρίδου-Πόθου
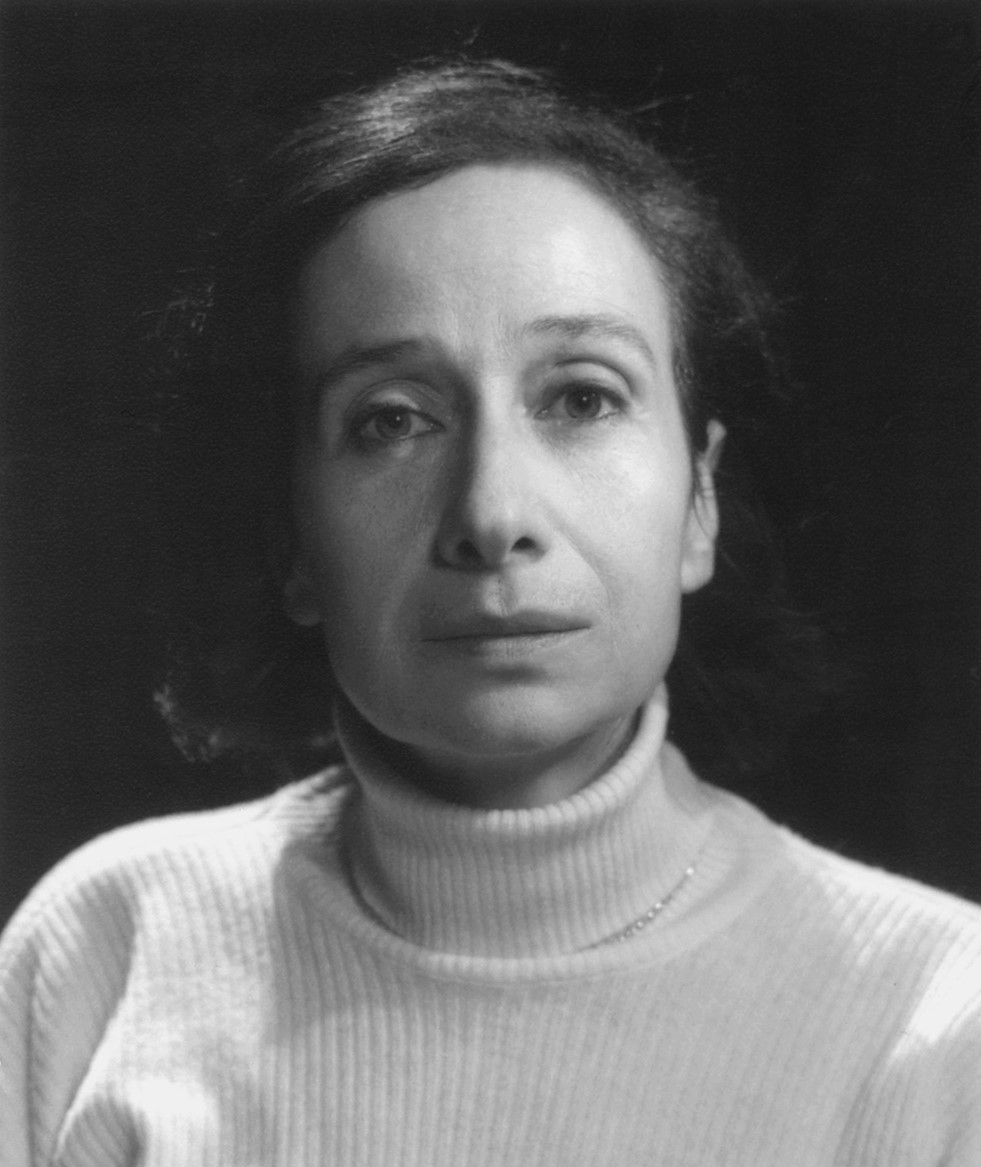
- Lampadaridou-Pothou in 1995
- Born: 15 October 1933; Myrina, Lemnos, Greece
- Died: 17 June 2023 (aged 89); Myrina, Lemnos, Greece
- Occupations: Novelist, playwright, poet
- Writing career
- Language: Greek, English, French
- Website: marialampadaridoupothou.gr

Maria Lampadaridou-Pothou (Greek: Μαρία Λαμπαδαρίδου-Πόθου; 15 October 1933 – 17 June 2023) was a Greek novelist, poet and playwright. She received awards and recognition from the Academy of Athens and other literary societies.

== Biography ==
=== Early years ===
Lampadaridou-Pothou was born in Myrina, Lemnos. From an early age, she developed an interest in literature. When she finished her elementary studies in Lemnos, she was appointed a clerk to the Provincial court of the island by written exams. In 1959 she published her first poetry collection, Encounters. Odysseus Elytis sent her a letter with his own positive review of the book, calling her a “fellow poet”. While she worked, she took exams at the Panteion University of Social and Political Sciences in order to complete a degree by distance learning. In 1963 she received her degree and settled in Athens permanently. Two years later she was granted a fellowship from the French Government to study Theatre at the Sorbonne University, Paris.

=== Paris ===
In September 1966, she traveled to Paris and settled at a student residence in the Quartier Latin. While she was there, she was introduced to the modern movements of Western philosophy, such as nihilism and the Theatre of the Absurd, as well as writers of existential agony, such as Albert Camus, Kafka, Samuel Beckett. The work of Beckett, especially, had a profound effect on her. His 1967 play "Oh les beaux jours" staged at Odeon Theatre in Paris deeply influenced her to ask him for permission to translate it into Greek. From then on they started a long lasting correspondence. She became a translator of his works but she also wrote an essay book titled “Samuel Beckett, The experience of the existential grief” which was published in 1983 with an important preface by Jacque Lacarrière with good reviews and republished updated in 2016 by Enastron Publishers. Having received a scholarship at Sorbonne she attended Theatre lessons, it was then that she wrote her first absurd theatre play. Her poetic surrealistic play “Glass Box” translated in French by Ann Creushez, along with two other of her plays “Small Cage” and “The Rafts”, were pre-approved by Odeon Theatre. Unfortunately, they were never staged because of the incidents of May 1968, in Paris. In June 1967 she received her diploma for Theatrical Studies and returned to Greece. Later, her theatrical play The Glass Box impressed Samuel Beckett who sent it to his director Jean Lui Barreau.

=== Years of dictatorship, the 70s ===
Lampadaridou-Pothou was living still in Paris, when a military regime was established in Greece. It was then that she wrote her theatrical play Antigone - Or the nostalgia of tragedy. This play was particularly loved by the distinguished theatrologist Bernard Dort, who happened to be her professor at Sorbonne. In 1996 this play, translated in English by Minoas Pothos and Rhoda Kaufman, was staged in California State university, Hayward, in parallel with the literary event of the Greek Culture week. Rhoda Kaufman also edited a collection of the writer's plays and poetry published under the name "A woman of Lemnos" by Guernica publications. Minoas Pothos with Theony Condos also translated her novel Natalia and Christina published by Lume Books in 2016.

When she returned to Greece in 1967, life was hard for her, as she was attending the demonstrations organised in support of Greece by the French philhellene Jacques Lacarrière. She did not hesitate to propose her work The Dance of Electra, a recently written allegorical depiction of the Greek junta, to the National Theatre. This work was at first rejected as “dangerous” but was finally staged at the New Stage of The National Theatre after a lot of effort, with police custody. The play's music was composed by Stavros Xarhakos and the scenography was made by Dionysis Photopoulos.

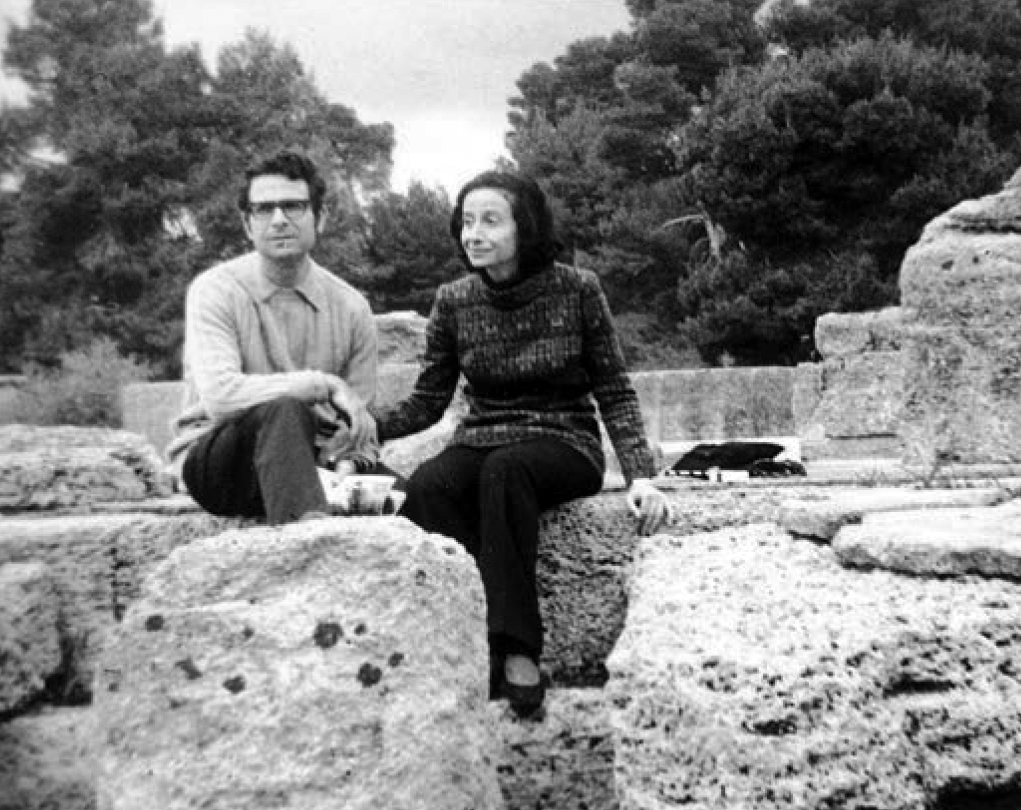
Maria in ancient Olympia with her husband Minos Pothos

In 1972, Maria was married to Minoas Pothos and they had a son, Emmanuel in 1973.

In 1973, she submitted her resignation to the Ministry and focused on her writing career. In 1987 she was awarded by the Academy of Athens for her historical novel Maroula of Lemnos about heroine Maroula of Lēmnos. In 1989 she published one of her most important collections of poetry, Mystic Passage. The book was translated into French and prefaced by Jacque Lacarrière and published in France by Le Temps qu'il Fait in 1995. Later, it was translated into Swedish, prefaced by Ingemar Rhedin and published by Bonniers in 1996 with good reviews. In 2002, the Mystic Passage was translated into English by Theony Condos with a preface by Apostolos Athanassakis and published in the New York university magazine, The Charioteer.

=== Later years ===
In 1973, she submitted her resignation to the Ministry in order to focus on her family and books. In 1976 she experienced the loss of her second child. Since then all her work has entered a metaphysical dimension and as quoted by her "she constantly searches for the truth and knowledge beyond conventional reality in order to achieve transcendence and discover the internal light".

In 1982, when ERT president was Iakovos Kampanellis her collection of texts Letter to My Son and a Star was broadcast by NRT-1 and later on was published as a book. Letter to My Son and a Star was loved by the public both as a radio show and as a book.

In 1995, she was awarded again by the Academy of Athens for her novel With the Storm Lamp. This novel provided her with a different experience. Due to the fact that her hero had experienced time in prison, the writer had sent 200 copies to Korydallos prison, for the convicts. This move was so well received by prisoners that they invited her to give a lecture, an invitation that she gratefully accepted.

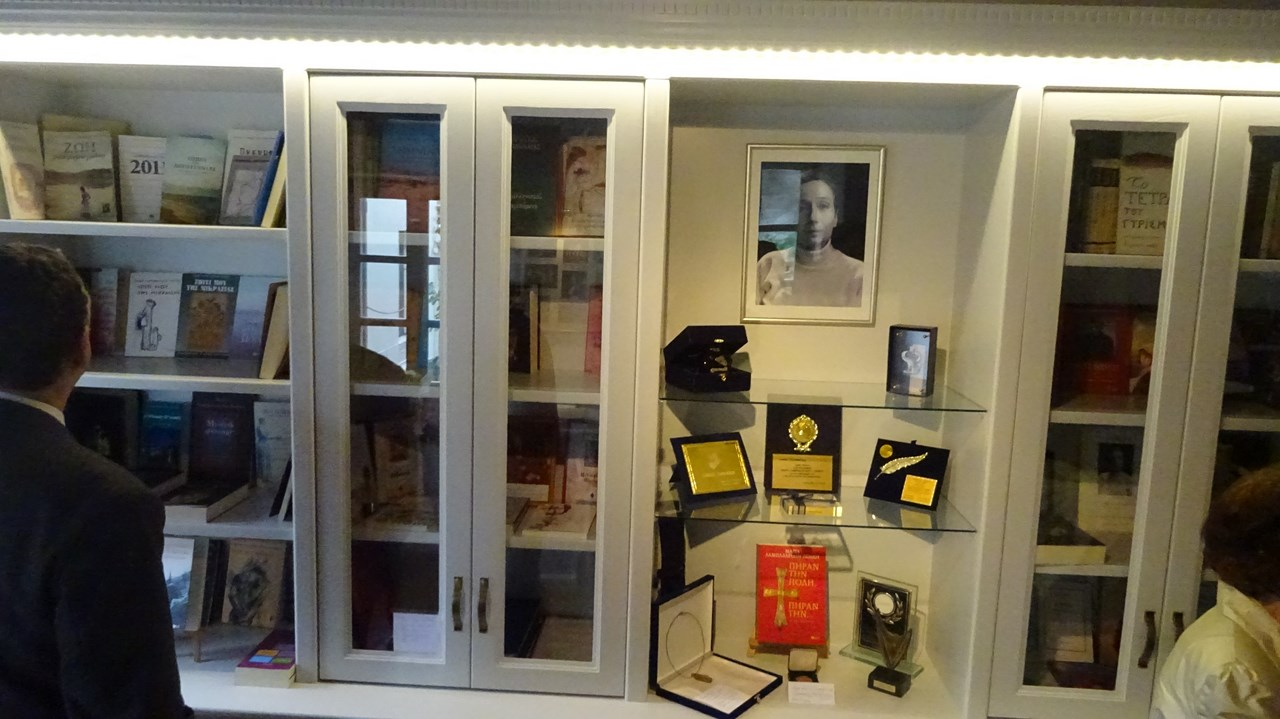
Maria Lampadaridou Pothou Hall in Myrina Lemnos

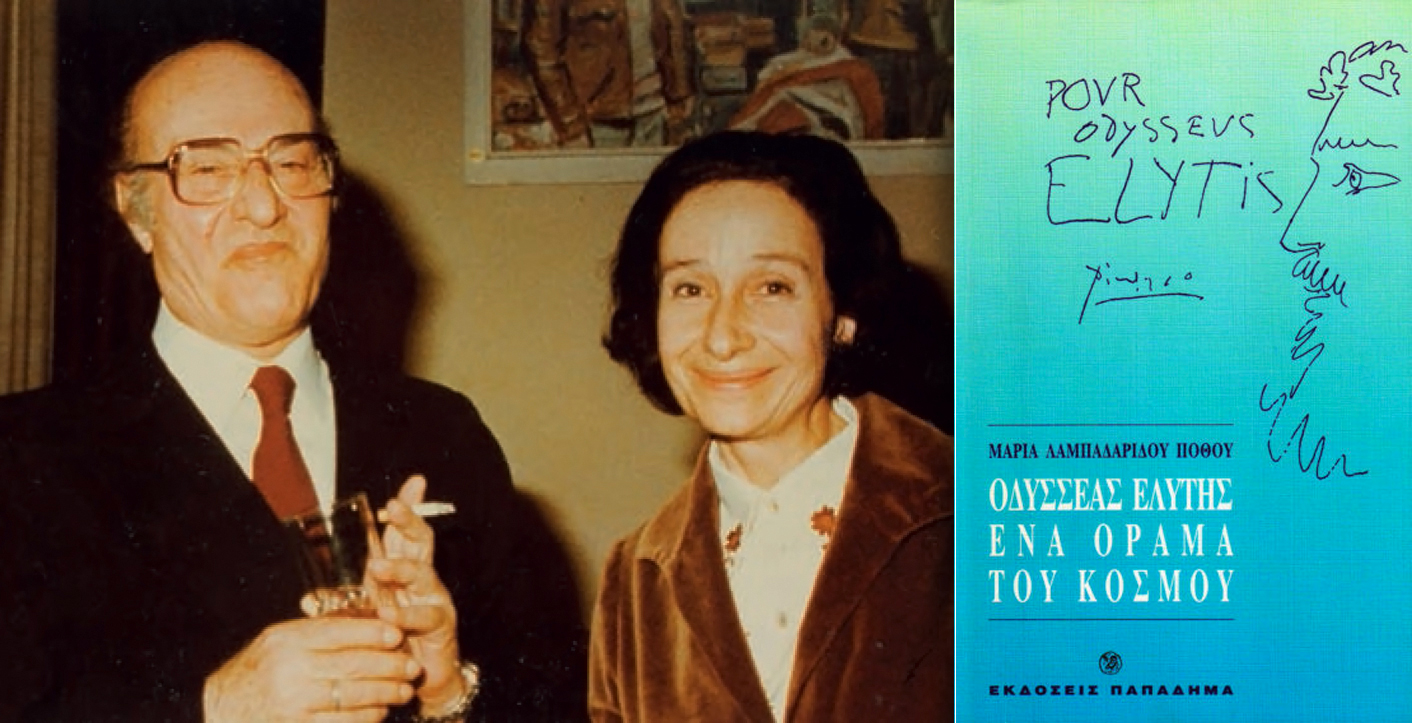
Maria Lampadaridou Pothou and Odysseus Elytis at the time when she wrote the book "Odysseus Elytis, A vision of the world". The gravure on the book was made by Pablo Picasso.

In October 2017, the Municipality of Lemnos donated to her a hall named "Maria Lampadaridou Pothou" at a recently renovated mansion, to house her precious things of her work (awards, medals, letters of Elytis and Beckett, doctoral dissertations). She was also awarded the honorary medal of the Island of Lemnos by mayor Dimitrios Marinakis.

In 2019, Maria's theatrical play titled Hector, Beloved by the Gods was staged at the Ancient theatre of Hephestia in Lemnos at the end of the international archeological conference on 15 September. The performance was realised by the theatrical group of MEAS LEMNOS with the support of the Ephorate of Antiquities of Lesvos. It was her first play to be staged at the renovated Ancient theatre of Hephestia.

On 17 July 2020, her historical novel The Wooden Wall was selected by the Permanent Representation of Greece to the EU for their “Readers of Europe reading list” initiative of the Council of the European Union. In the official post, among other things, it was written "The Wooden Wall offers inspiration in these trying times and reminds us of the timeless value of democratic principles."

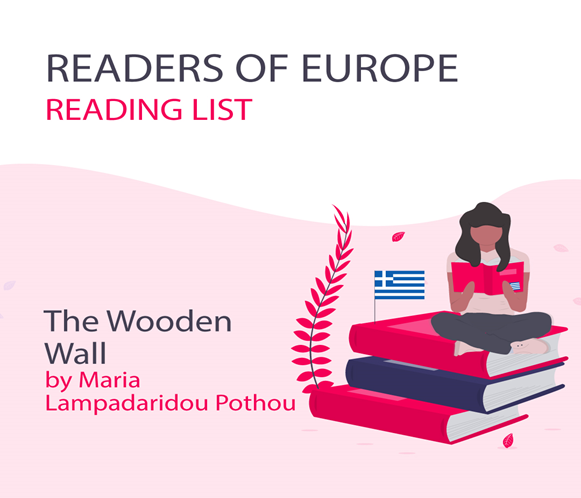
Maria Lampadaridou Pothou's The Wooden wall in the Readers of Europe reading list. Among others it was written "‘The Wooden Wall’ offers inspiration in these trying times and reminds us of the timeless value of democratic principles. Ancient Greek literary works need no introduction. But modern Greek literature has also produced several masterpieces, not least the works of two Nobel Prize laureates – Giorgos Seferis and Odysseas Elytis."

Over her career, she had written more than 20 novels and published poetry and theatrical plays. She has also published numerous articles, critical reviews, and essays, in literary journals and daily newspapers, “To Vima”, “Kathimerini”, “Eleftherotypia” for many years. She has participated in many international conferences in Greece and abroad as in 1988 in Buffalo NY, 1st International Women Playwrights conference, where the writer in a general session had made an intervention "I hear about the problems of each speaker, problems of their country or of their personal life, or social or sexual or color problems, and I understand that the problem describes the difficulty of being a playwright. I don't hear about women's dramatic creativity as an existential necessity. I don't hear about the stuff of her plays, the stuff of her dreams, of her internal need to be a playwright in this troubled world." She has also participated in many literary events like in Berkeley. She was a member of the Hellenic Authors Society, the Association of Greek Playwrights, and the International Institute of the Theatre.

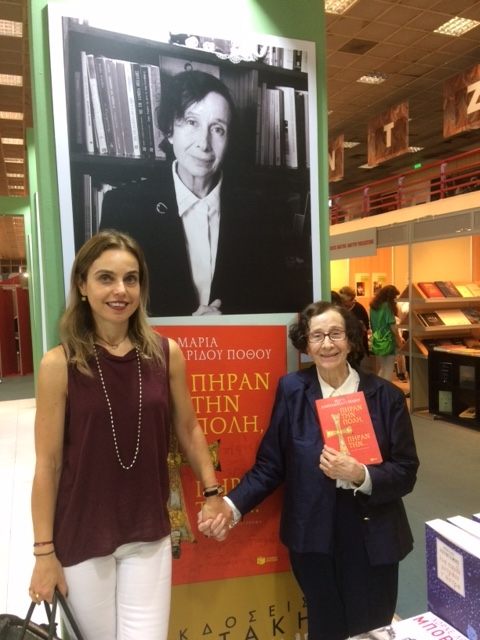
With Anna Pataki of Patakis Publications in the 14th Thessaloniki Bookfair in front of the poster of the book "The city has been taken"

Her theatrical plays that have been staged in Greece and abroad include A game with time, I am a weeping star, The rafts, The Glass Box.. The latter was also taught in Sorbonne by professor Charles Antonetti and was published in the magazine education et theatre.

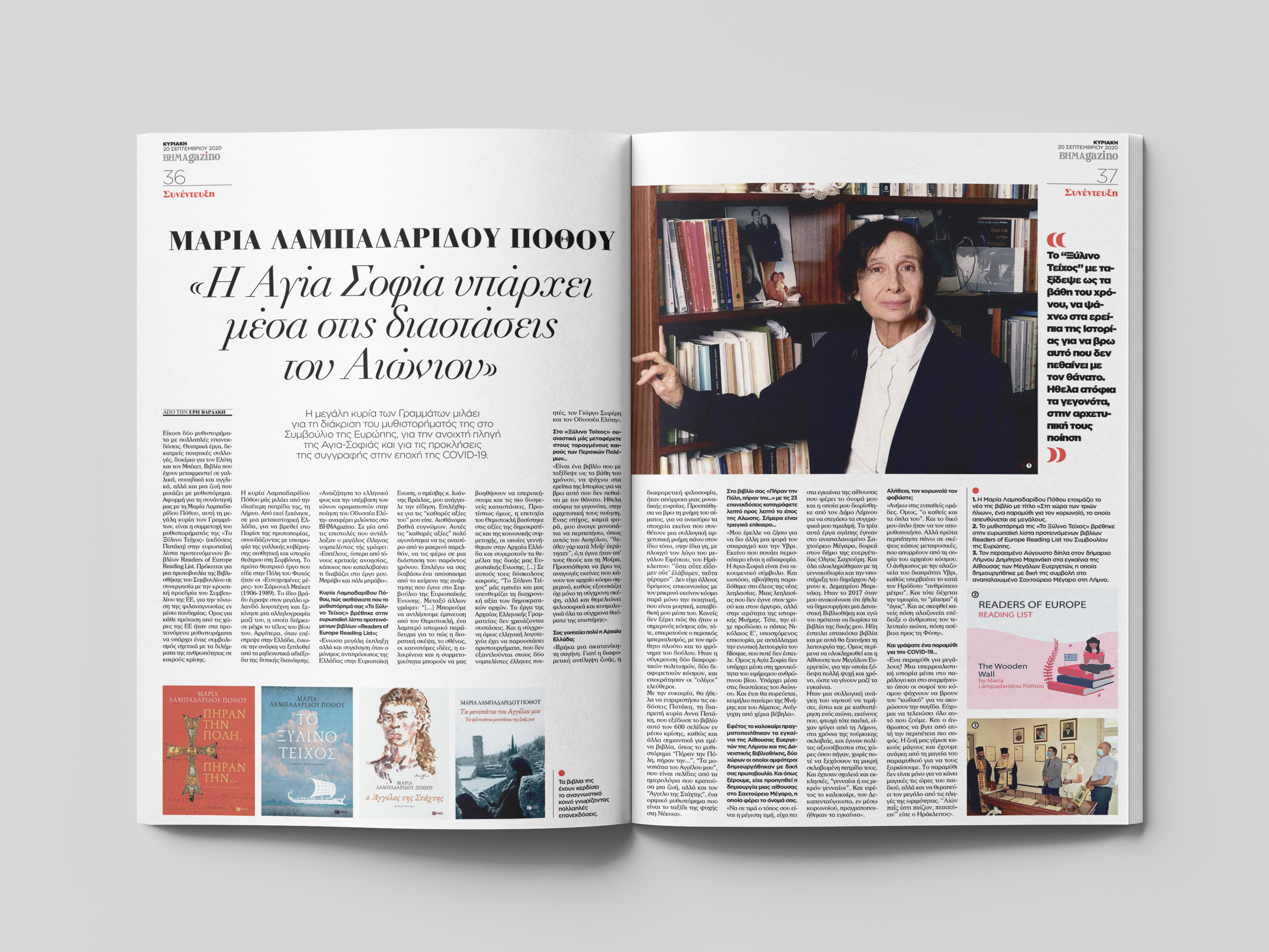
Interview in ΒΗΜΑgazino titled "Hagia Sophia exists into the dimensions of the eternal". The writer speaks about her book "The wooden wall" at the EU.

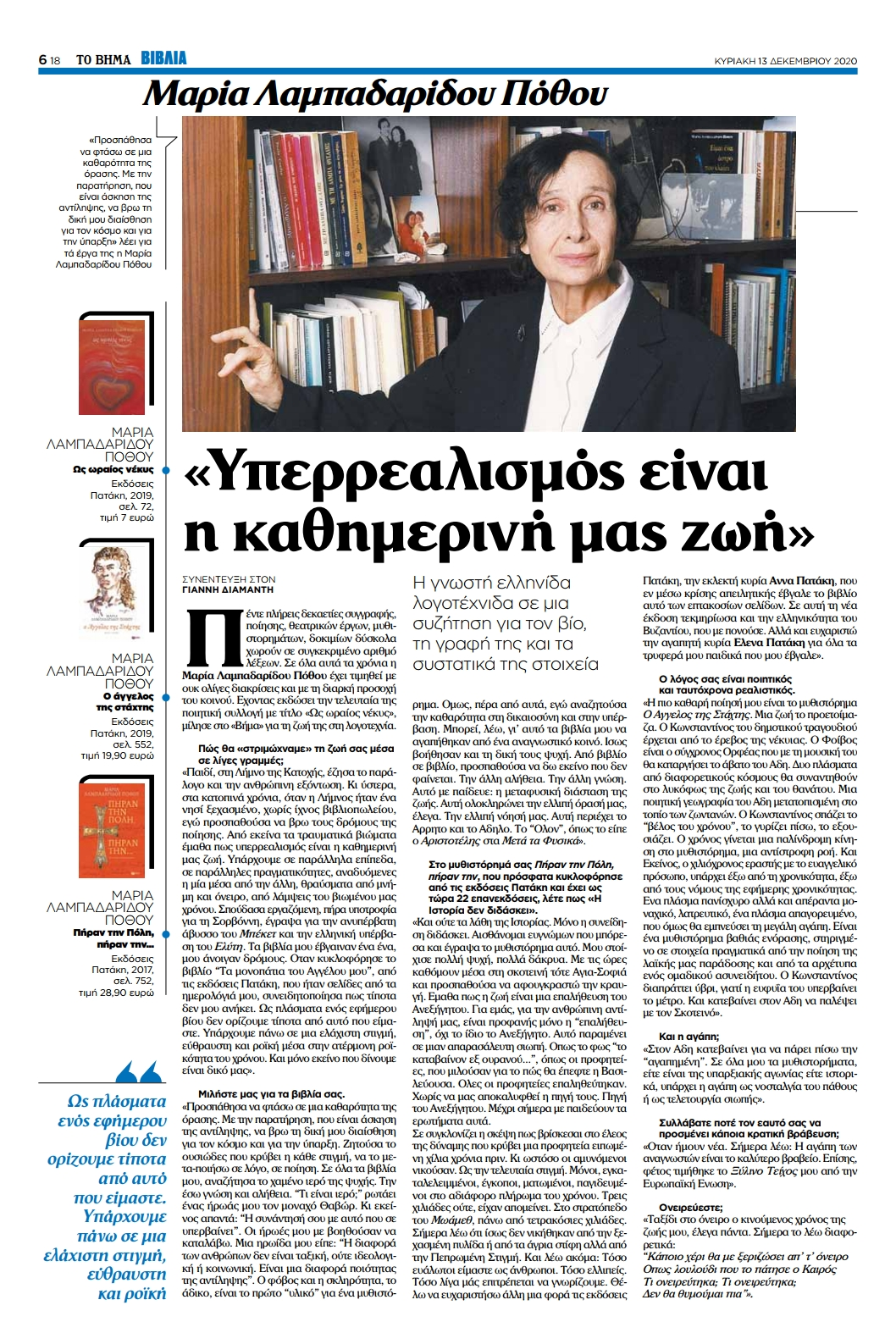
Surrealism is our daily life. We exist in parallel levels, in parallel realities where one emerges from the other, fragments of memory and dream, flashes from our lives.

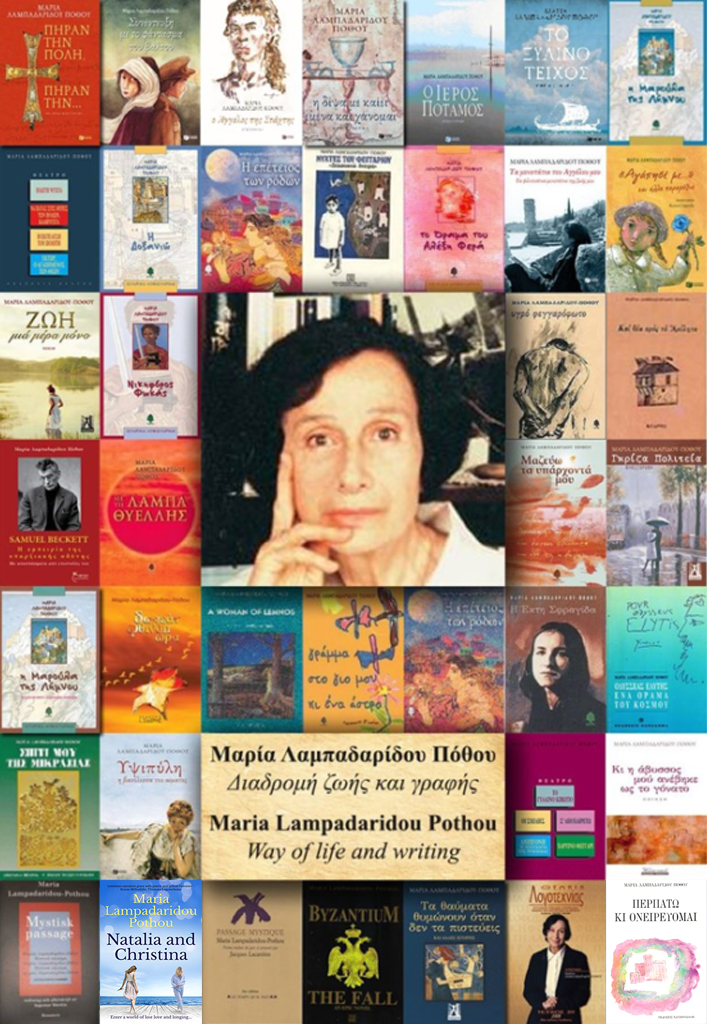
Interview to professor Dimitra Chalazia, for the magazine "Knowledge travels.. in Greek" published in Switzerland (February 2017)

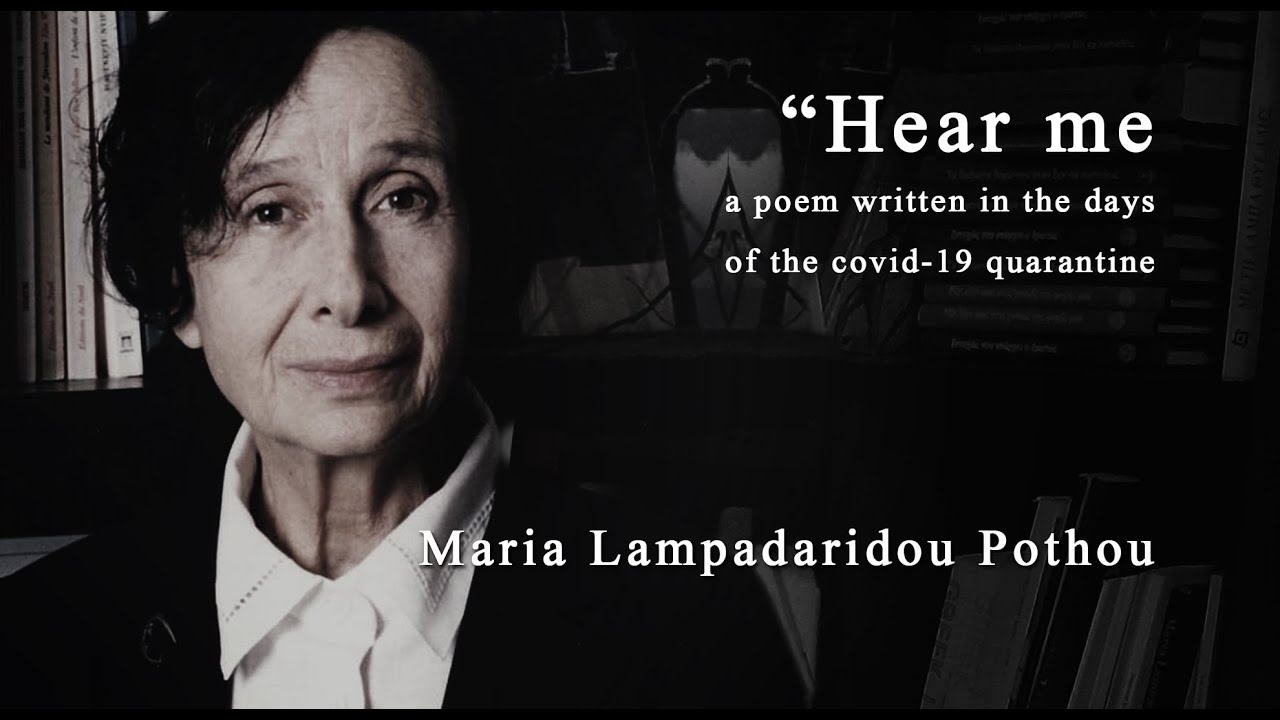
Hear me - a poem by Maria set to music by Aristotelis Tsiamalos https://www.youtube.com/watch?v=GfOFHLgkU24

=== Death ===
She died in her birthplace, Myrina, Lemnos on June 17, 2023, at the age of 89.

== Selected works ==
2020	Orpheus in the Enchanted Forest, Patakis Publications, New edition
2019	The beating of your heart, Patakis Publications
2019	As a beautiful dead, Patakis Publications
2019	The angel of ashes, Patakis Publications, New edition
2018	The Wooden Wall, Patakis Publications, New edition
2018	The planet with the hanging houses, Patakis Publications
2017	The City has been taken, Patakis Publications, New edition
2016	Pathways of my angel, Patakis Publications
2015	Samuel Beckett, The experience of existential grief, Enastron Publications
2015	Love me... and other fairytales, Patakis Publications
2014	Interview with the swamp ghost, Patakis Publications
2013	Thirst burns me and I am lost, Patakis Publications
2012	The Abyss rose up my knees, Govostis Publications
2012	Miracles get angry when you don't believe, Govostis Publications
2011	Grey city, Govostis Publications
2011	Life, only one day, Govostis Publications
2010	Theatre II, Kedros Publications
2010	Theatre, Kedros Publications
2010	I'll look for you in paradise, Agyra Publications
2010	Hypsipyle, The Queen of the Blood, Patakis Publications
2009	Sacred Symbols, Kedros Publications
2008	With the Storm lamp, Kedros Publications
2007	Gathering my Belongings, Kedros Publications
2006	Spartan, Patakis Publications
2003	Sacred river, Patakis Publications
2002	A letter to my son, Kedros Publications
2002	The Anniversary of Roses, Kedros Publications
2002	The vision of Alexis Feras, Kedros Publications
2001	Grey city, Patakis Publications
2001	Natalia and Christina, Patakis Publications
2001	The angel of ashes, Kedros Publications
2000	A star crying alone, Agyra Publications
1999	The sixth seal, Kedros Publications
1999	Walking and dreaming, Vasdekis Publications
1998	Theatre, Kedros Publications
1998	A view of the unspoken, Kedros Publications
1996	The last emperor of Byzantium..., Kedros Publications
1995	Grey city, Kalendis Publications
1995	Asia minor my home, Kedros Publications
1995	Remember, Kalendis Publications
1994	A letter to my son, Hellenic book club Publications
1994	Natalia and Christina, Kalendis Publications
1994	Odysseus Elytis, a vision of the world, Papadimas Publications
1993	With the storm lamp, Kalendis Publications
1992	Nicephorus Fokas, Kedros Publications
1991	Answer to a letter and my guilt, Hellenic book club Publications
1991	Maroula of Lemnos, Kedros Publications
1990	Doxanio, Kedros Publications
1989	Mystic passage, Euthini Publications
1984	Nights with Moon, Hestia Publishers
1980	Orpheus in the Enchanted Forest, Vasdekis Publications
1979	The child was a star that faded away, Philippotis Publications
1975	In our Times of Betrayal, Greek Book Publications
1973	The light of your face, Greek Book Publications
1969	Landscapes of Adolescence, Poems in the Latin Quarter, Greek Book Publications
1968	Paper faces, Dodoni Publications
1965	Small cage, Hestia Publications
1963	Small Worlds, Mavridis Publications
1961	Study, Hestia Publications
1959	Encounters, Mavridis Publications

=== Performed plays ===
Antigone or the Nostalgia of Tragedy

- 1971-1972: Staged in Flamand Belgium, Malpertuis Theatre directed by Berten De Bells
- 1978: Performed on State Radio in Athens.
- 1996: Staged in California State University, Directed by Edgardo de la Cruz

Electra' s Dance

- 1971: Staged in National Theater of Greece directed by Lambros Kostopoulos, music by Stavros Xarchakos and stage design of Dionysis Photopoulos

Paper Moon

- 1978: Performed on Greek State Television

Bidding you Farewell

- 1986-1987: Staged in G. Zeriggas Theatre
- 1991: It was produced during the Second International Women Playwrights Conference, Toronto

The Glass Box

- 1971: Staged in National Theater of Greece.
- 1988: Staged during the First International Women Playwrights Conference, Buffalo New York.
- 1990: At the National television Channel in Athens.

Hector, beloved by the gods

- 2019: Staged at the Ancient theatre of Hephestia in Lemnos, during the International Conference "the Sanctuaries and Cults in the Aegean.

=== Book publications in other countries ===
- Lampadaridou-Pothou, Maria; Lacarrière, Jacques (1995). Passage mystique : poème (in French). [Cognac, France]: Le temps qu'il fait. ISBN 2-86853-191-1. OCLC 35230219.
- Lampadaridou-Pothou, Maria; Rhedin, Ingemar (1996). Mystisk passage : Mystiko perasma (in Swedish). Stockholm: Bonnier. ISBN 978-91-0-056373-8. OCLC 185783867.
- Lampadaridou-Pothou, Maria (2002). "Mystiko Perasma" (PDF). The Charioteer: An Annual Review of Modern Greek Culture. 39/40. Parnassos, Greek Cultural Society. ISSN 0577-5574.
- Lampadaridou-Pothou, Maria; Kaufman, Rhoda Helfman (2002). A woman of Lemnos : plays and poetry. Toronto: Guernica. ISBN 1-55071-120-2. OCLC 47868993.
- Natalia and Christina, Endeavour Press, 2001

=== Articles ===
- George Steiner, "Antigones, How the Antigone Legend Has Endured in Western Literature, Art, and Thought"
- Five Great Odes by Paul Claudel
- The labor of a great thinker, review on the works of Malevitsis
- Lost innocence in indecent times
- "Motivational passions" a review of the book Days Of Anger by Sylvie Germain
- The evergreen tree, lectures and articles about Greek culture, by George Thomson
- The being and the world - The lesser known side of Iris Murdoch through her philosophical thinking
- "Thucydides and Athenian Imperialism" by Jacqueline De Romilly
- and many others

== Awards ==
- 1966. The “Group of Twelve” for her literary work
- 1987. Academy of Athens, for the novel Maroula of Lemnos
- 1995. The Ourani's Foundation of the Academy of Athens for the novel With the Storm Lamp.
- 2001. State theater prize for the theatrical play Floating Night.
- 2014. Α prize of the Greek IBBY section for the young people novel Interview with the swamp ghost.
- 2017. The Municipality of Lemnos honorary medal award.
