= Maroula of Lemnos =

Venetian heroine

Maroula of Lemnos (fl. 1478) was a fifteenth-century Venetian heroine and figure of legend of the Ottoman–Venetian War (1463–1479).

== History ==
During the 1478 siege of Kotsina Castle on the island of Lemnos by Suleiman Pasha in the First Ottoman–Venetian War (1463–1479), eighteen-year-old Maroula is said to have defended the fortress from invading Ottoman Turks. Her father was supposedly a soldier who died of a serious injury sustained during the siege, so Maroula raised his bloody sword and led the military garrison into battle. Due to her actions, Maroula was given dowry by the Venetian state and was allowed to choose an officer to become her husband.

== Legacy ==
Maroula's story was recorded in a 1669 poem by Italian Jesuit priest Girolamo Dandini. Her legend has inspired other Italian and Greek authors, including Maria Lampadaridou-Pothou, Kostis Palamas, Marcus Antonius Coccius Sabellicus and Alessandro Maria Vianoli [de]. Lampadaridou-Pothou was awarded by the Academy of Athens for her historical novel Maroula of Lemnos.

A statue of Maroula stands near to the Zoodohos Pigi church on the former site of Kotsina Castle. The statue was financed by the Teachers’ Association of Lemnos, was designed by Hippocrates Savouras and was erected in 1969.
