= Romanou =

Romanou Ρωμανού
- Community
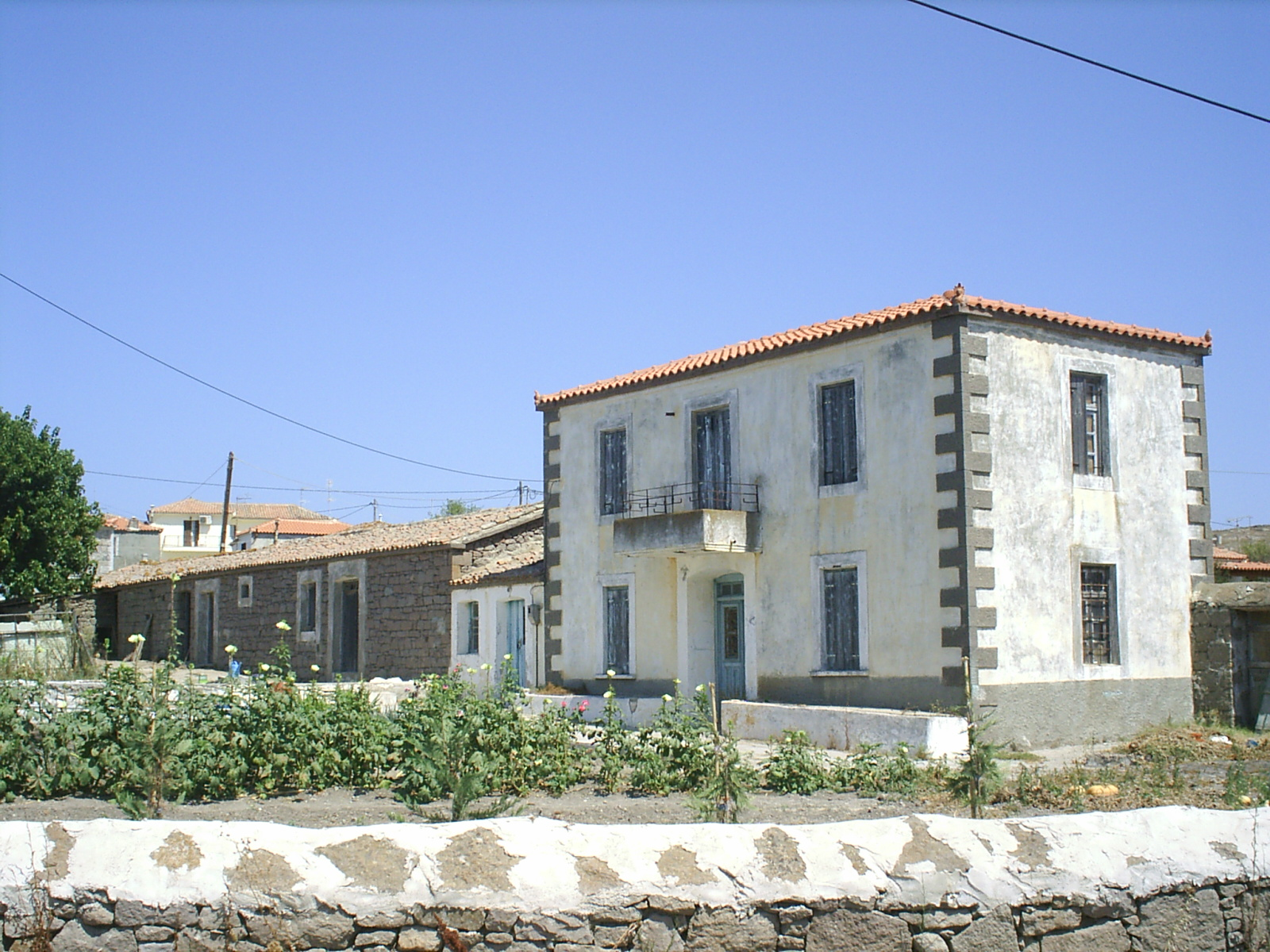
- Smyrnaean type farmhouse with integrated mantra in Romanou

- Location within Greece
- Coordinates: 39°54′18″N 25°17′24″E
- Country: Greece
- Administrative region: North Aegean
- Regional unit: Lemnos
- Municipality: Lemnos
- Municipal unit: Moudros

Population (2021)
  - Community: 296
- Time zone: UTC+2 (EET)
  - Summer (DST): UTC+3 (EEST)

Romanou (Greek: Ρωμανού, officially Ρωμανόν - Romanon) is a village and a community on the island of Lemnos, Greece. It is part of the municipal unit of Moudros. The community consists of the village Romanou and the deserted rural settlement Komi. Romanou is 2 kilometres (1.2 mi) southwest of Repanidi, 2 kilometres (1.2 mi) southeast of Lychna and 4 kilometres (2.5 mi) northeast of Moudros.

== Komi ==
The settlement Komi is situated on a low hill northeast of Romanou. In the late 19th century, the remains of an ancient temple of Heracles were found near the village. The German archaeologist Fredrich photographed the ruins and estimated that the temple had a size of 15 by 32 metres (49 by 105 ft). The ancient temple was succeeded by a Byzantine settlement with a church, as shown by the remains of walls and marble that can be found in today's farming settlement. Most of the remains were used for construction, and already in 1918 nearly nothing remained from the ancient temple. Italian archaeologists have found ancient tombs near the site of the temple.

The settlement Komi was first mentioned in 1785 as a "village". In 1858, Conze mentioned Komi both in text and in his map. In 1874, the settlement had six houses, but no Christian residents were reported. Apparently, it was inhabited by Turkish people who owned the farms around the village. From the mid-19th century, the farms came into possession of rich Greek ship owners and immigrants from Egypt, living in the nearby village of Romanou. They built a church dedicated to Agia Fotida, sister of Saint Photine, probably named so because it was built near a well.

Other signs of former human presence in the area are two chapels, one of St. John (built in 1877) and another of St. Anthony. There is a spring, rebuilt in 1953. Today, Komi is uninhabited. There are 15 to 20 abandoned houses that are used as sheds by the farmers of Romanou.

== Bibliography ==
- Belitsos, Theodoros, Lemnos and its villages, 1994.
- Belitsos, Theodoros, H Aγία Φωτίδα της Κώμης, p 123
