= Moudros =

Moudros Μούδρος
- Municipal unit
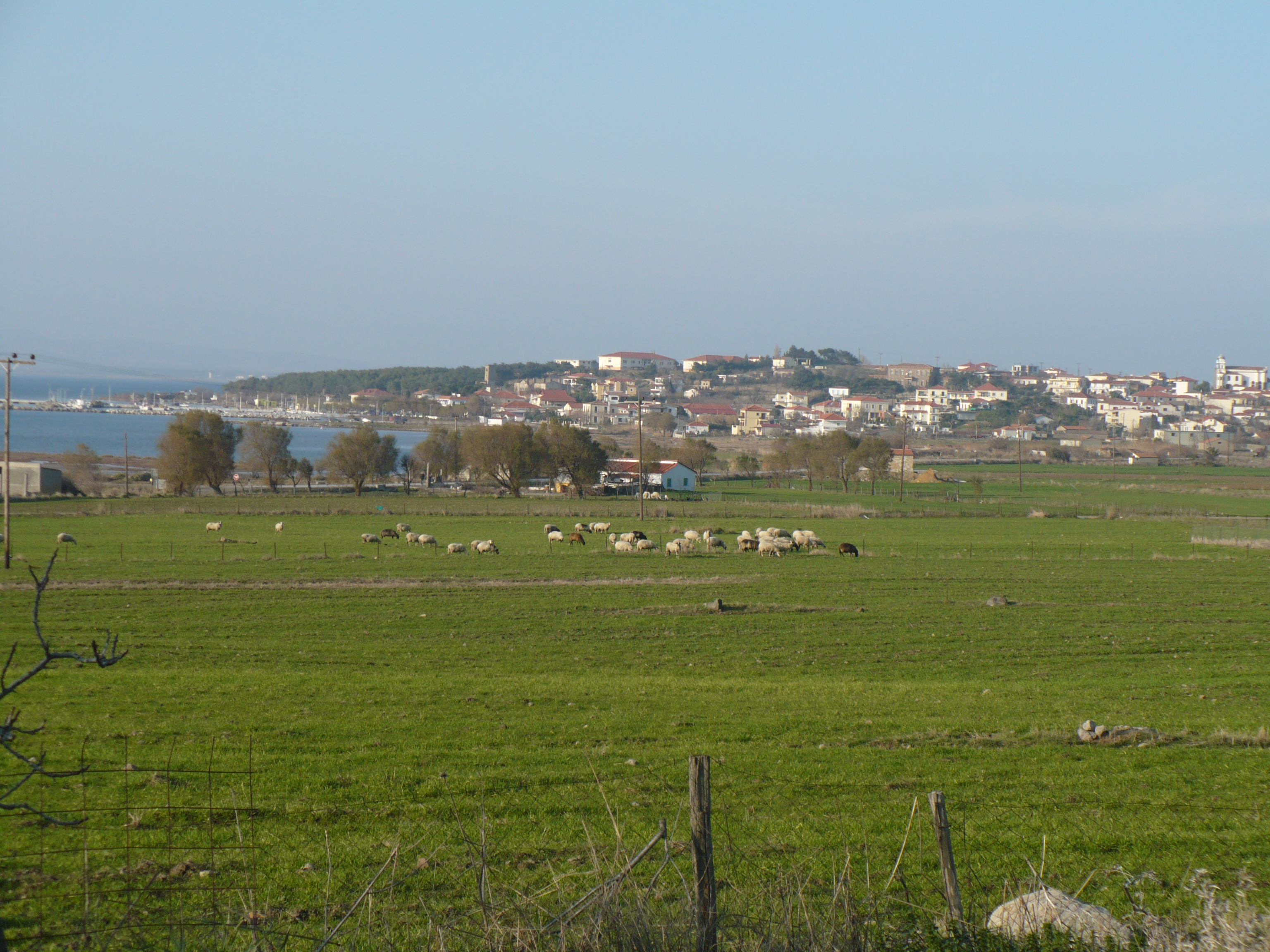
- View of the village and bay

- Location within the regional unit

- Location within Greece
- Coordinates: 39°52′N 25°16′E
- Country: Greece
- Administrative region: North Aegean
- Regional unit: Lemnos
- Municipality: Lemnos

Area
  - Municipal unit: 185.1 km^{2} (71.5 sq mi)

Population (2021)
  - Municipal unit: 3,398
  - Municipal unit density: 18.36/km^{2} (47.55/sq mi)
  - Community: 873
- Time zone: UTC+2 (EET)
  - Summer (DST): UTC+3 (EEST)
- Vehicle registration: MY

Moudros (Greek: Μούδρος) is a town and a former municipality on the island of Lemnos, North Aegean, Greece. Since the 2011 local government reform it is part of the municipality Lemnos, of which it is a municipal unit. It covers the entire eastern peninsula of the island, with a land area of 185.127 km^{2}, covering 38.8% of the island's territory. The municipal seat was the town of Moúdros. Its second largest town is Kontopouli. The municipal unit's total population was 3,398 in the 2021 census.

== History ==
During the Dardanelles Campaign of the First World War, the town and its harbour were used as an Allied base, commanded by Admiral Rosslyn Wemyss. The British Empire troops used the form Mudros.

On 30 October 1918, it was the site of the signing of the Armistice of Mudros, which saw the end of hostilities between the Ottoman Empire and the Allies.

East Mudros Military Cemetery maintained by the Commonwealth War Graves Commission (CWGC) contains 885 burials of Commonwealth soldiers and sailors who died during the Gallipoli Campaign, including 148 Australians, 76 New Zealanders and 85 unidentified. The CWGC also maintains a memorial at West Mudros Muslim Cemetery that marks the graves of 170 men of the Egyptian Labour Corps and 85 Turkish soldiers from that campaign.

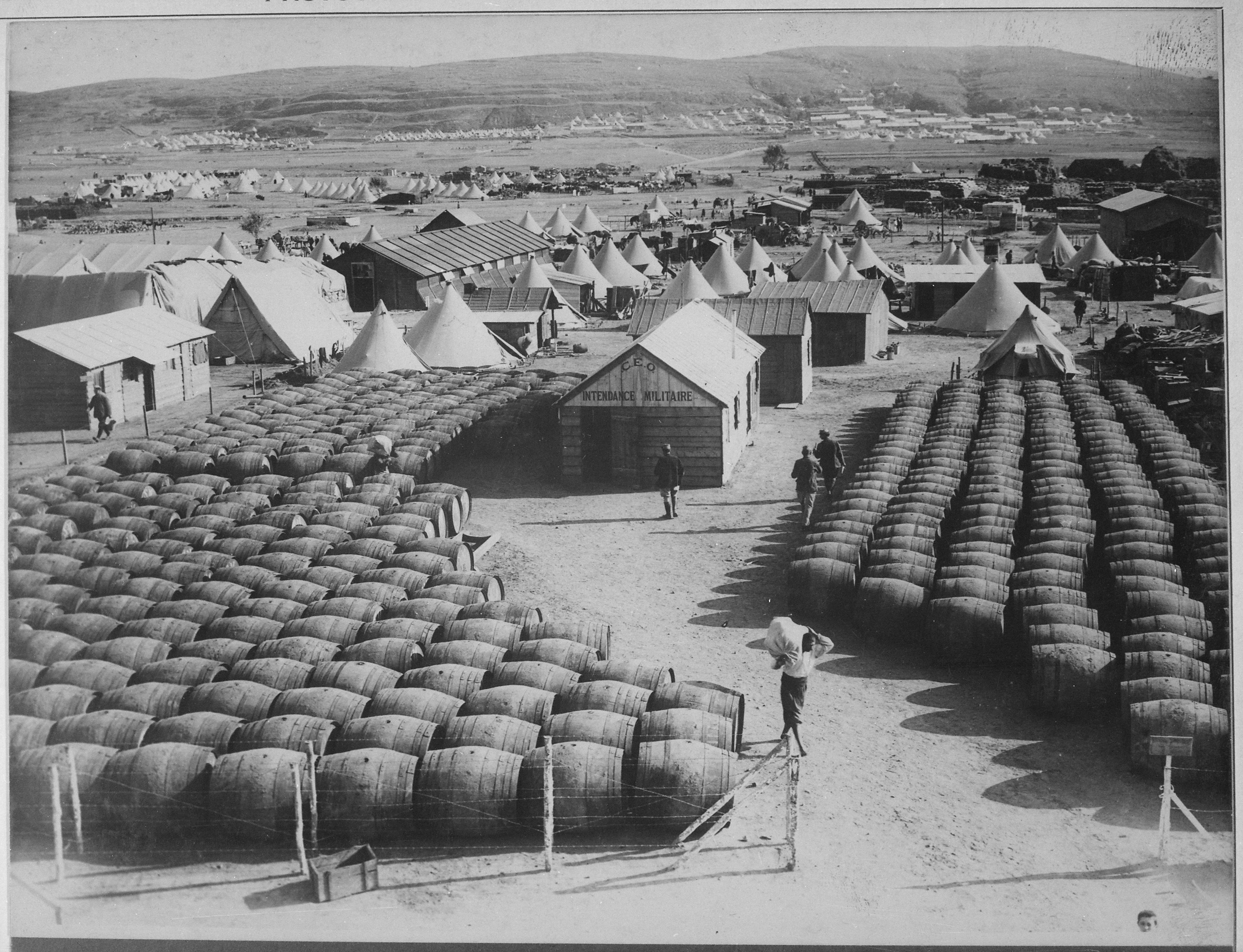
View of Mudros during the Dardanelles Campaign, with a French military wine store in the foreground and a hospital in the background.

== Subdivisions ==
The municipal unit Moudros is subdivided into the following communities (constituent villages in brackets):

- Fisini (Fisini, Agia Sofia)
- Kalliopi
- Kaminia (Kaminia, Voroskopos)
- Kontopouli (Kontopouli, Agios Alexandros, Agios Theodoros)
- Lychna (Lychna, Anemoessa)
- Moudros (Moudros, Koukonisi)
- Panagia (Panagia, Kortisonas)
- Plaka
- Repanidi (Repanidi, Kotsinos)
- Roussopouli
- Romanou
- Skandali
