= Conze =

Conze is a surname, and may refer to:

- Alexander Conze (1831–1914), German archaeologist
- Eckart Conze (born 1963), German historian
- Edward Conze (1904–1979), British scholar
- Julian Conze (born 1999), German footballer
- Werner Conze (1910–1986), German historian
