= Lychna =

Community in Lemnos, Greece

Lychna Λύχνα
- Community
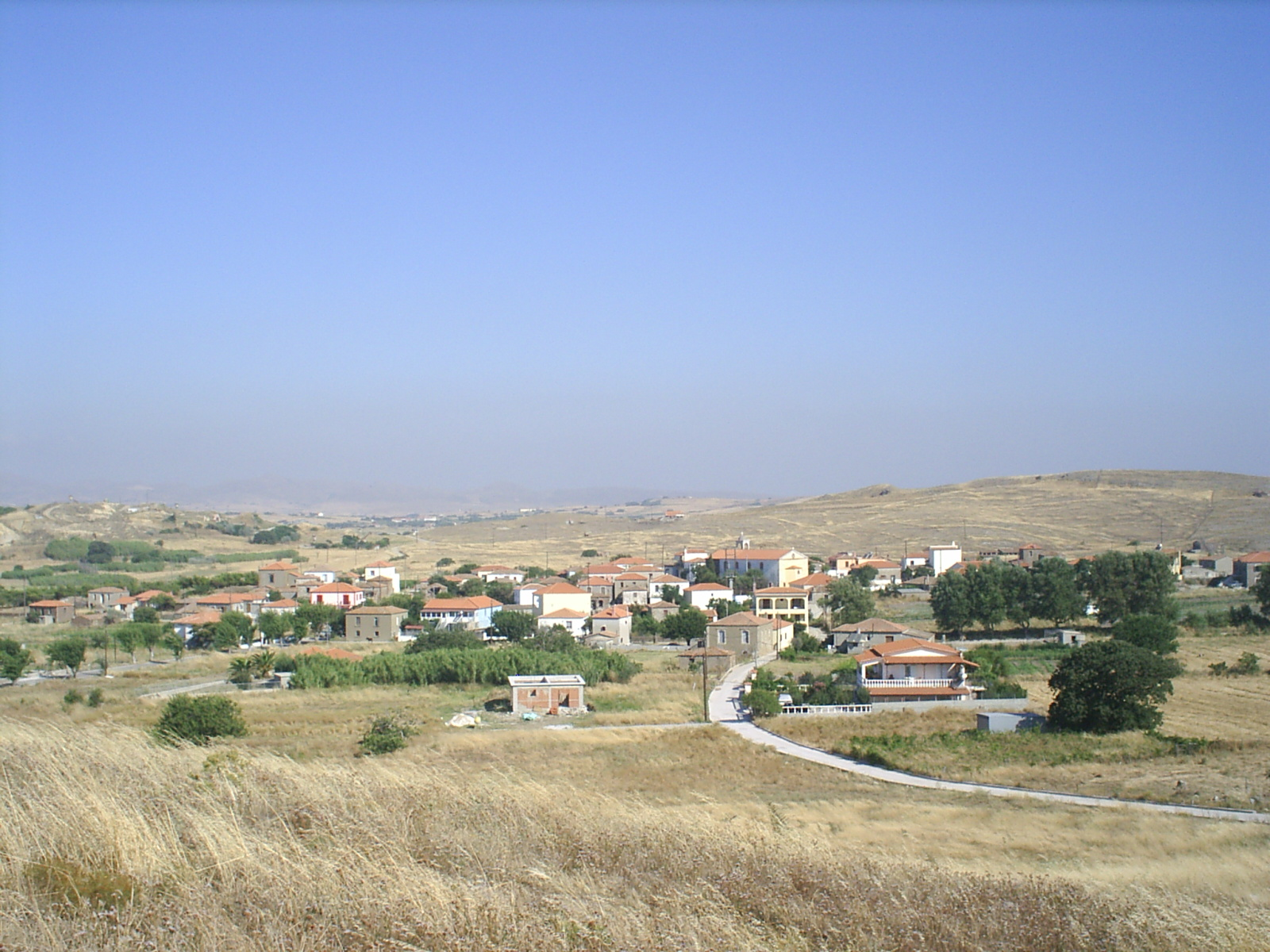

- Location within Greece
- Coordinates: 39°54′58″N 25°16′3″E
- Country: Greece
- Administrative region: North Aegean
- Regional unit: Lemnos
- Municipality: Lemnos
- Municipal unit: Moudros

Population (2021)
  - Community: 218
- Time zone: UTC+2 (EET)
  - Summer (DST): UTC+3 (EEST)

Lychna (Greek: Λύχνα) is a village and a community in the island of Lemnos, Greece. The community includes the village Anemoessa. It is part of the municipal unit of Moudros. It is situated at about one kilometer from the swampy shore of the bay of Moudros, at 10 m elevation. It is 1.5 km south of Varos, 2 km northwest of Romanou, 4 km north of Moudros and 18 km east of Myrina.

== Population ==
Year	Village	Community
1921	318	-
1981	120	-
1991	137	-
2001	132	338
2011	110	320
2021	85	218

== Name ==
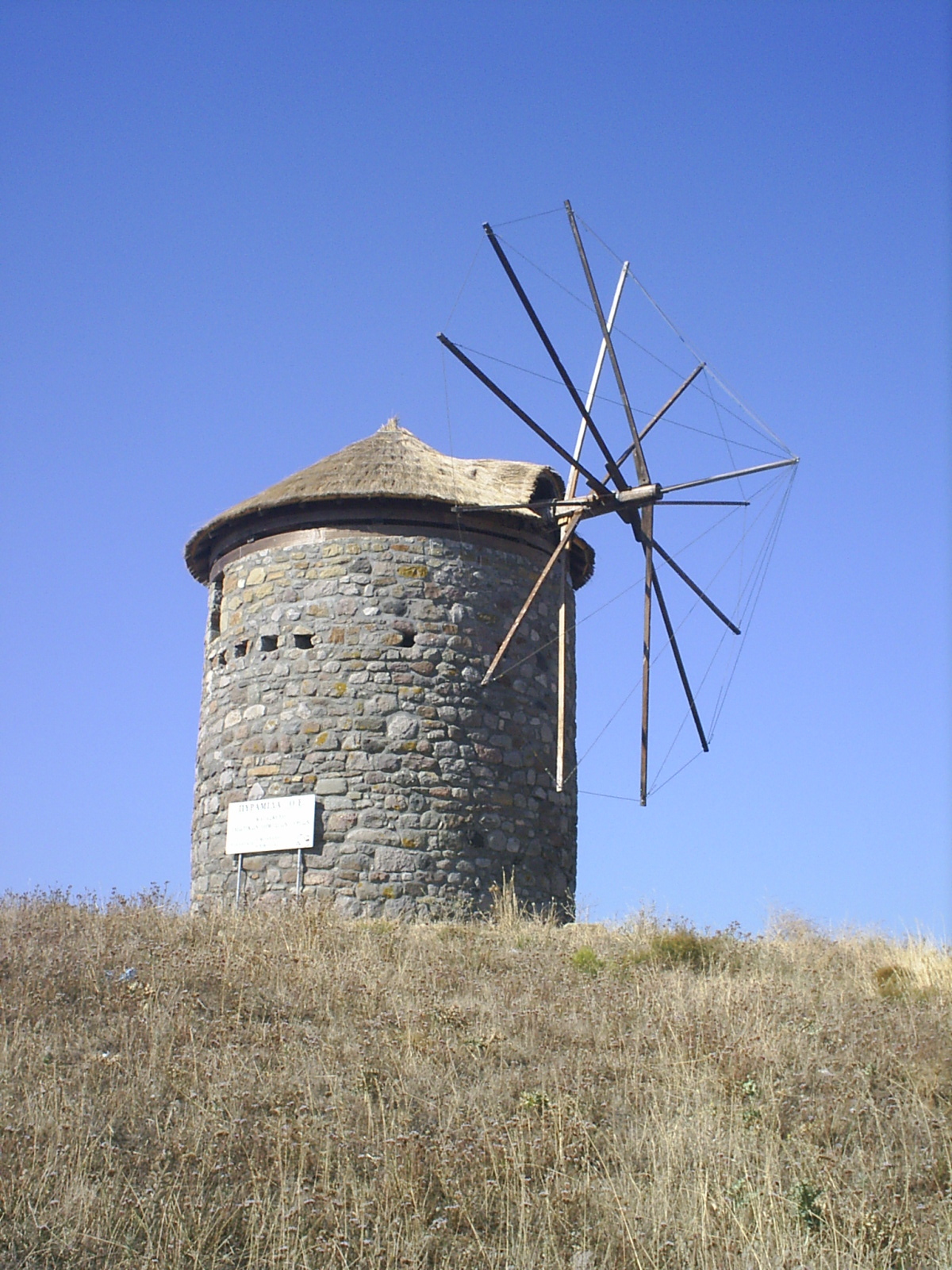
Windmill

According to tradition, its name (meaning "lights") is derived from the small lamps of the houses, that were visible at night to sailors on the bay. It can't be excluded that there was some sort of lighthouse, from which the name could be derived. On the English Admiralty charts a small cape named Akra Likhna was indicated.

The village was first mentioned in 1785 by the French traveller Choiseul-Gouffier. On his map the name was marked including the article "ta": Taligna (τα Λύχνα ta Lychna), and the nearby cape was marked as Cap Blanc. The same error was made by the travellers Conze (1850, Talihna) and De Launay (1898, Talikna). In 1904 Friedrich correctly mentioned it as Lychna.

== History ==
In the 19th century, it was an organised village that was mentioned in public documents. In 1856, there were 71 men between 18 and 60, who paid 2,272 piastres to avoid subscription. In 1874, there were 50 Christian families, and there were 67 houses. Its residents were farmers and pastoralists, and many worked in Asia Minor as builders and artisans. Outside the village, near the cemetery, there is a spring from which the village obtained its water. Near this spring there was a French military camp during the First World War.

In 1912, Lychna became an independent community. In the interwar period, the village saw some growth, and it had 318 inhabitants in 1928. After the Second World War, due to the emigration, its population declined, to 120 inhabitants in 1981. Many of its inhabitants moved to Athens. In 1991, the communities of Lychna and Anemoessa were united.

== Points of interest ==
In 1865, the church of Saint Demetrius was built. In 1924, an impressive external narthex with carved stonework was added. Two carved columns with elaborately carved capitals came from an older church. The church was decorated by Grigorios Papamalis in 1940.

Due to its small population, the village never had a community school. Its children attended schools in the nearby villages Romanou and Varos. In 1910, a beautiful school was built in a prominent spot at the expense of Dimitrios G. Makris, a businessman in Egypt. He also restored the village aqueduct.

== See also ==
- List of settlements in the Lemnos regional unit
