= Julian Conze =

German footballer

Personal information
- Date of birth: 9 September 1999 (age 27)
- Place of birth: Münster, Germany
- Height: 1.86 m (6 ft 1 in)
- Position: Midfielder

Team information
- Current team: 1. FC Gievenbeck
- Number: 27

Youth career
- SG Telgte
- 1. FC Gievenbeck
- –2018: Preußen Münster

College career
Years	Team	Apps	(Gls)
2019–2022	UMBC Retrievers	24	(0)
2022–2023	Portland Pilots		

Senior career*
Years	Team	Apps	(Gls)
2018–2019	Preußen Münster	1	(0)
2018–2019	Preußen Münster II	19	(0)
2020–2021	→ 1. FC Gievenbeck (loan)	7	(2)
2024–	1. FC Gievenbeck	16	(5)
- * Club domestic league appearances and goals as of 26 May 2024

Julian Conze (born 9 September 1999) is a German footballer who plays as a midfielder for Oberliga Westfalen club 1. FC Gievenbeck.

== Club career ==
After five years in the jersey of Preußen Münster, he moved to the United States to study, where he receives a sports scholarship from the University of Maryland, Baltimore County. In addition to his studies, Conze would be playing for the college soccer team.
