= Kontopouli =

Kontopouli Κοντοπούλι
- Community
- Location within Greece
- Coordinates: 39°56′N 25°20′E
- Country: Greece
- Administrative region: North Aegean
- Regional unit: Lemnos
- Municipality: Lemnos
- Municipal unit: Moudros

Area
  - Community: 37.04 km^{2} (14.30 sq mi)

Population (2021)
  - Community: 578
  - Density: 15.6/km^{2} (40.4/sq mi)
- Time zone: UTC+2 (EET)
  - Summer (DST): UTC+3 (EEST)

Kontopouli (Greek: Κοντοπούλι) is a village and a community in the municipal unit of Moudros in the northeastern part of the island of Lemnos, Greece. The community includes the small villages Agios Alexandros and Agios Theodoros. Its total area is 37.04 km^{2}. Kontopouli is 1 km northwest of Kalliopi, 3 km east of Repanidi and 8 km northeast of Moudros.

There are several small farming settlements around Kontopouli. Most of them are presently uninhabited, but some date back to the Byzantine era. The most important of these is Agios Alexandros. Other villages are Dimosia, Agios Georgios Amniou (near the Alyki lake), Neftina (on the bay in the northwest where the Turkish manor of Haji Pasha was located), Agios Theodoros (also Saravari) and Geranos (also Ageranou).

== Population ==
Year	Village population	Community population
1871	281	-
1920	997	-
1940	1,208	-
1951	1,158	-
1981	809	-
1991	650	-
2001	661	703
2011	623	634
2021	564	578

== The name ==
The village owes its name to the Byzantine landowner Kontopoulos who donated part of the area to the Great Lavra monastery on Mount Athos, according to the historian Komninos Pyromaglou. It was referred to in 19th century local records as Kondopoul, a name still used by locals. It became a commune in 1918 and changed its name to Kontopoulion.

== History ==
According to oral tradition, the village was founded by residents from Kotsinos and Agios Ypatios. Evidently at the end of the 17th century when Kotsinos was abandoned, many inhabitants resettled in Kontopouli. The origin of part of its inhabitants from Agios Ypatios is confirmed by the fact that the local church is dedicated to Saint Hypatius.

Kontopouli was first mentioned in 1739, during the Turkish rule, by Pococke as Ontopol. In 1788 Choiseul-Gouffier mentioned it on his map as a nameless village, and in 1858 Conze mentioned it as Kondopuli. From the early 19th century, the village developed into the main village of northeast Lemnos. In 1856, 370 men between the ages of 18 and 50 paid 11,840 kuruş in order to avoid army conscription, which underlines the importance of the village. Conze mentioned it as a large, tall and comfortably situated village.

=== Late 19th century ===
From the late 19th century, the population began to decline as several people moved to nearby Panagia. It had 204 families in 1863, and only 190 in 1874. It had 281 people in 1874. Since 1863, it had a school, located on the grounds of Agios Dimitrios and also receiving students from Kalliopi and Panagia. The old building was demolished in 1948. In 1874, it joined the network of 12 community schools around the island. It had three classes and from 1903, five classes.

The impressive church of Agios Dimitrios was completely reconstructed between 1892 and 1902, using building materials from the ruins of ancient Hephaistia. It is a three-aisled basilica with a dome. The church was paid for by Emmanouil and Despoina Dimitriadis, a merchant family from Alexandria.

=== 20th century ===
In the last years of Ottoman rule, Kontopouli developed with fast pace. The Kontopolians had three representatives in the provincial council. The growth continued during the interwar years and the village was the third most populated community on the island in 1940. Its population was 997 in 1920 and rose to 1,208 in 1940. Due to its population growth, an independent girls' school operated between 1916 and 1925. The new school built by Dimitriadis was not sufficient, and in 1930, a new school funded by the Egyptian Konstantinos Evangelidis was opened, which still operates today. In 1937, a kindergarten school was opened.

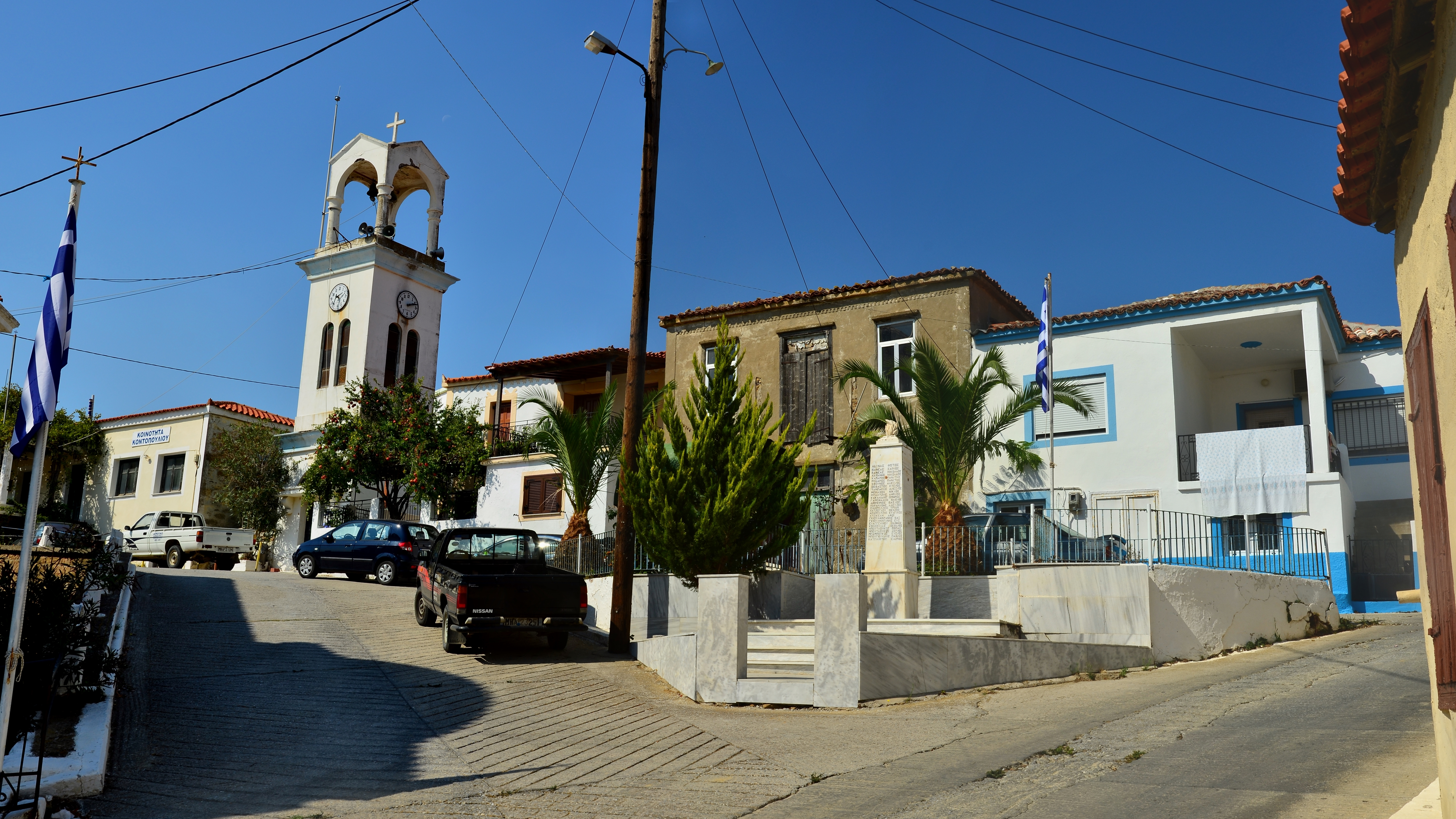
A view

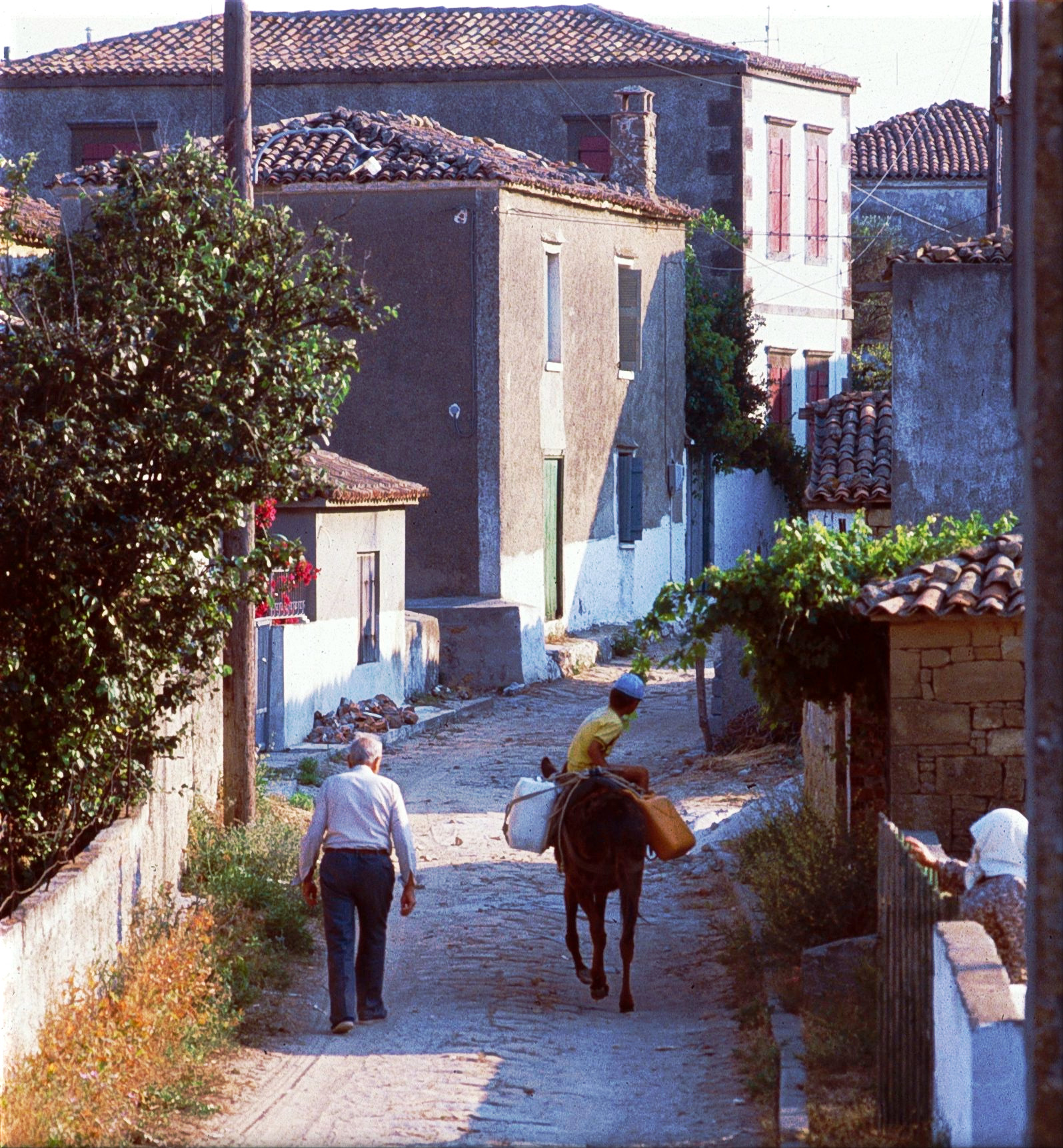
Street

In 1928 the other church (Agia Anastasia) was completely renovated. The excavations of the ancient sites at Palaiopoli (Hephaistia) and Chloe (Kaveirio) began in 1926. The athletic club Hephaestia was founded in 1932 and is one of the oldest in the island. In 1927, a large fountain was built, paid by the community of Kontopouli. The main health problem, which affected all the villages around the Chortarolimni lagoon, was malaria.

=== Modern period ===
During the Axis occupation of Greece during World War II, Kontopouli was ruled by the German army. It suffered a lot of damage to its schools and its public buildings. During the Greek Civil War, the poet Yiannis Ritsos lived in exile in Kontopouli. He mentioned the village in his works. After the war, emigration affected the village, its population fell from 1,136 in 1951 to 650 in 1991.

== Localities ==
=== Kastrovouni ===
The hill Kastrovouni (also Kastrovouno) was mentioned around 1355 as property of the Karakallos Monastery. The remains of a medieval underground construction have been found, probably a church, but some suggested it to be the ancient labyrinth of Lemnos which was mentioned by Pliny. In 1884, I. Pantelidis made excavations and founded marble inscriptions. In 1904 Fredrich found that they were the ruins of the medieval Kastrovouni castle, probably from the 14th century. In 1917, Sealy described and photographed the underground building, which measured 40 by 12–14 feet. Today there is a chapel to Saint Spyridon on the hill, and chapels to St. Blaise and St. John in Palaiopoli.

=== Dimosia ===
Dimosia is a former village north of Kontopouli, and just north of Agios Alexandros. It was mentioned in 1415 in a document of the monastery of Great Lavra on Mount Athos as ai Dimosiai. By the middle of the 19th century, it was abandoned, as was the whole area of Lemnos north of Kontopoulos. In 1858 the German traveler Conze found cultivation in major parts of the plain between Cape Plaka and Kontopouli but no settlement. There were only isolated huts, which locals called estates and all the lands belonged to residents of Agios Ypatios and Kontopoulos.

When the estates passed into Christian ownerships, settlements started to develop around them. One of them was Dimosia, first marked on the 1904 map of Fredrich. But it was deserted again, and the only remnants of the settlement are some cattle walls and the chapels of Saint George and Saint Demetrios.

== Sports ==
- The athletic games Erimakeia, named after the benefactor of the sports club Kostas Erimakis, are held in the good sports stadium of the village. For many years it was the only stadium on the island.

== See also ==
- List of settlements in the Lemnos regional unit

== Sources ==
- Tourptsoglou-Stefanidou Vassiliki, Voyages and Geographical Sources From Lemnos Island (15th-20th Centuries) (Ταξιδιωτικά και γεωγραφικά κείμενα για τη νήσο Λήμνο (15ος-20ος αιώνας) = Taxidiotika ke geografika kimena yia ti niso Limno (15os-20os eonas))
- Belitsos, Theodoros, Lemnos and its villages by Th. Belitsos 1994.
- Lemnos/Limnos Province CD ROM (Cdrom Επαρχείου Λήμνου = CD ROM Eparcheiou Limnou): Lovable Lemnos
- Belitsos, Theodoros: Kontopouli in Lemnos, Limnos, 492 (8-27-2007)
