= Hephaestia =

Archaeological site on Lemnos, Greece

Coordinates: 39°57′53″N 25°19′06″E

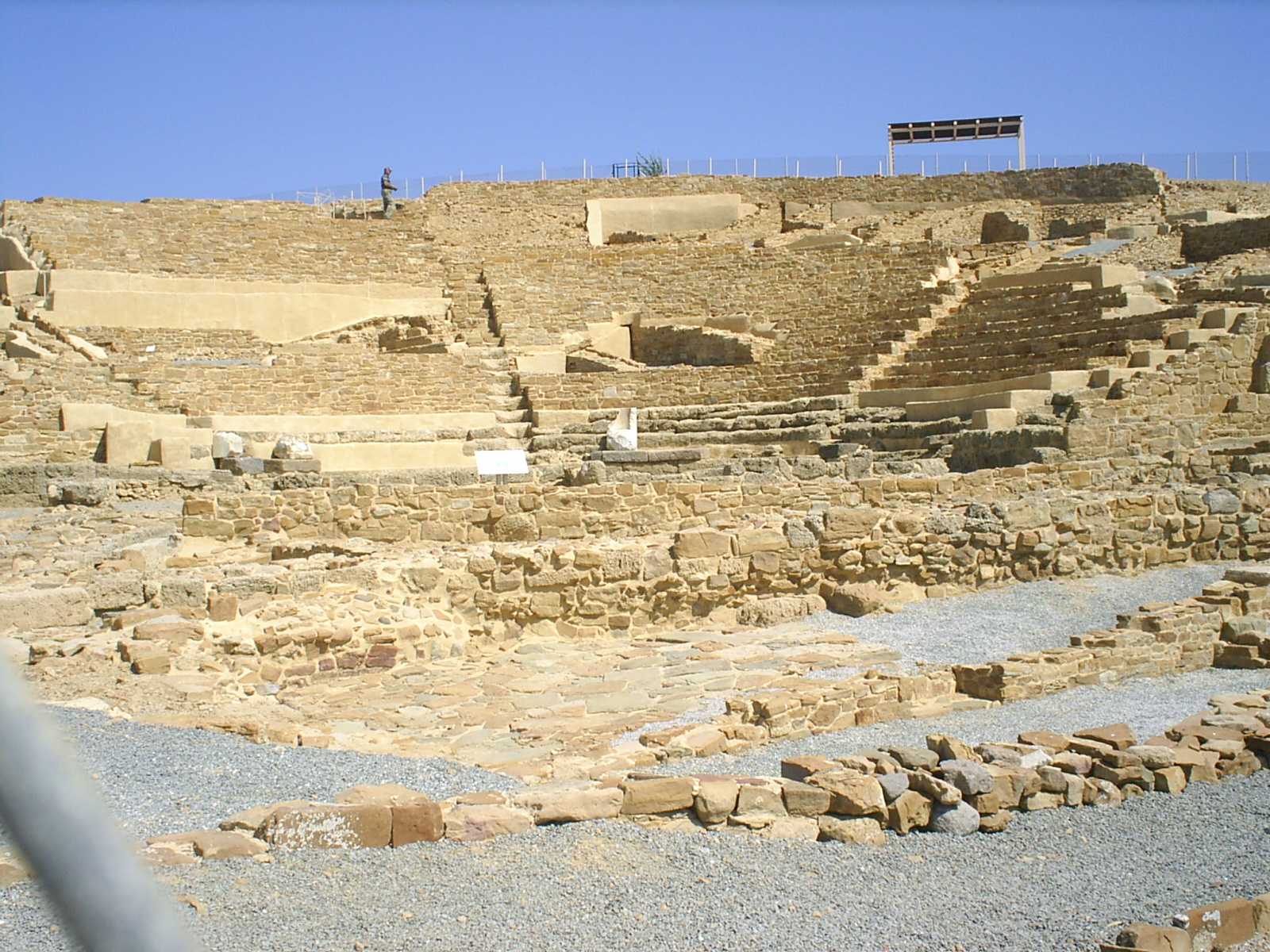
The ancient theater in Hephaistia

Hephaestia and Hephaistia (Ancient Greek: Ἡφαιστία), or Hephaestias or Hephaistias (Ἡφαιστίας), was a town of Ancient Greece, now an archaeological site on the northern shore of Lemnos, Greek island in the northern Aegean Sea. It was named in the honor of Hephaistos, Greek god of metallurgy, whose cult was maintained on the island. It was once the capital of the island (8th to 6th centuries BCE), of which only the ruins remain.

The Greek theater dates from between the late 5th and early 4th century BCE. It underwent reconstruction from 2000 to 2004, and in 2010 the first theater play (Sophocles' Oedipus Rex) was played after 2,500 years. The theatre has capacity of 200 people in the main area, and additional 1,000 outside.

== History ==
According to the historian Herodotus, the cities of the island of Lemnos, Hephaestia and Myrina, were inhabited by Pelasgians. These Pelasgians had promised to return the island to the Athenians if on any occasion Athenian ships, pushed by the north winds, managed to arrive in less than nine days from Athens to the island. Many years later, the Athenians under Miltiades the Younger made the crossing in eight days. The Pelasgian inhabitants of Hephaestia left the island but those of Myrina resisted and were besieged until they surrendered, around the year 500 BCE.

The town was recorded by later writers, including Pliny the Elder, Ptolemy, and Stephanus of Byzantium.

Coins of Hephaestia survive.

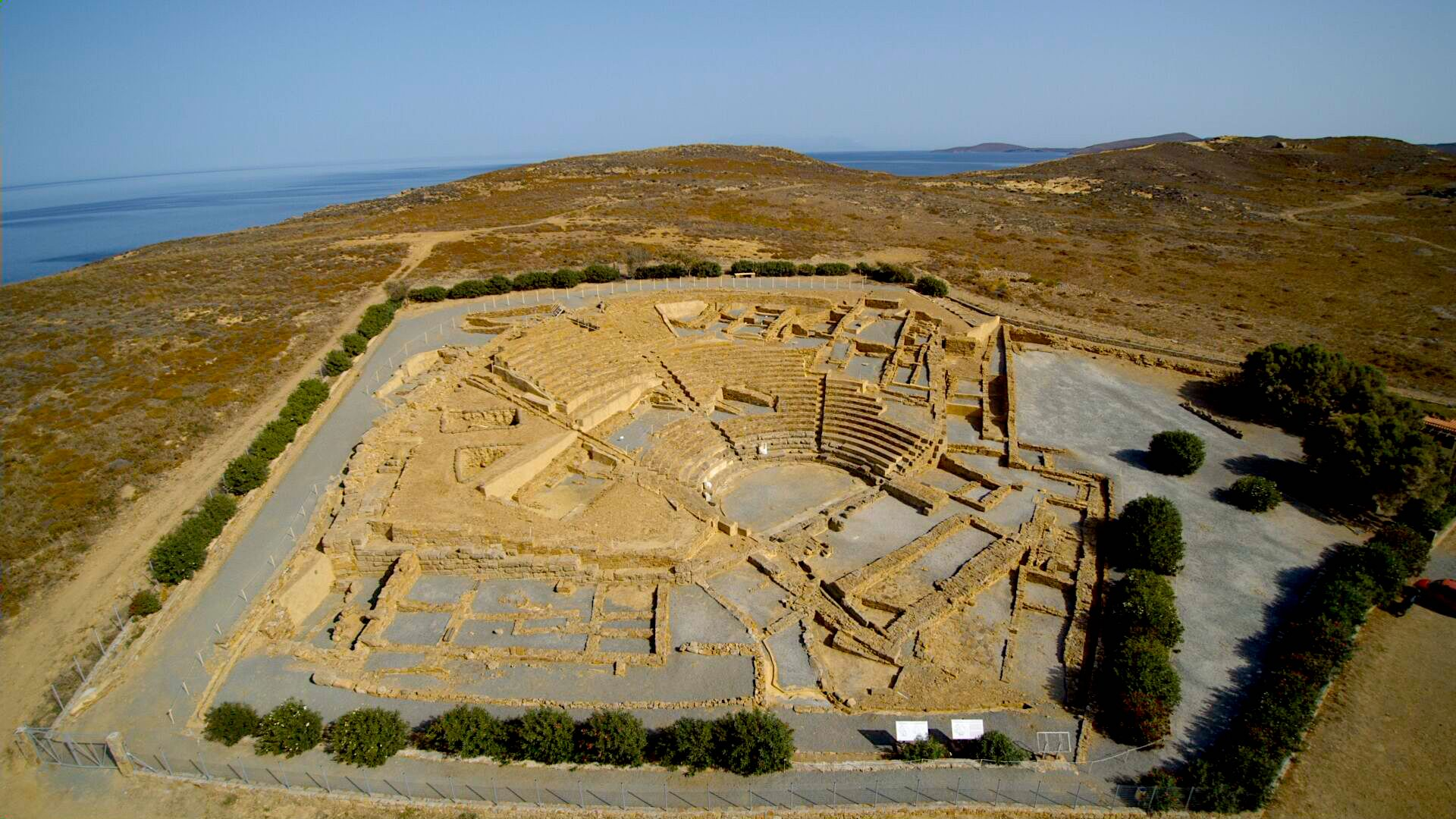
Ancient theater of Hephaistia

== Discovery ==
In August and September 1926, members of the Italian School of Archaeology at Athens conducted trial excavations on the island. The overall purpose of the excavations was to shed light on the island's "Etrusco-Pelasgian" civilization. The excavations were conducted on the site of the city of Hephaistia (i.e. Palaiopolis) where the Pelasgians, according to Herodotus, surrendered to Miltiades of Athens. There, a necropolis (c. 9th–8th centuries BCE) was discovered, revealing bronze objects, pots, and over 130 ossuaries. The ossuaries contained distinctly male and female funeral ornaments. Male ossuaries contained knives and axes whereas female ossuaries contained earrings, bronze pins, necklaces, gold-diadems, and bracelets. The decorations on some of the gold objects contained spirals of Mycenaean origin, but had no Geometric forms. According to their ornamentation, the pots discovered at the site were from the Geometric period. However, the pots also preserved spirals indicative of Mycenaean art. The results of the excavations indicate that the Early Iron Age inhabitants of Lemnos could be a remnant of a Mycenaean population and, in addition, the earliest attested refer to Lemnos is the Mycenaean Greek ra-mi-ni-ja, "Lemnian woman", written in Linear B syllabic script.
