= Platy, Lemnos =

Village on Lemnos island, Greece

Platy Πλατύ
- Community
- Location within Greece
- Coordinates: 39°51′41″N 25°4′17″E
- Country: Greece
- Administrative region: North Aegean
- Regional unit: Lemnos
- Municipality: Lemnos
- Municipal unit: Myrina

Population (2021)
  - Community: 782
- Time zone: UTC+2 (EET)
  - Summer (DST): UTC+3 (EEST)

Platy (Greek: Πλατύ) is a village and a community on Lemnos island in Greece. It is located in the southwestern part of the island, between the village of Thanos and the main city, Myrina. The village's population ranges from about 200 people during winter to about 600 during summer.
