= Lemnian deeds =

Cruel slaughter of someone as revenge

A Lemnian deed is the cruel slaughter of someone as revenge. There are two possible origins for this term: the epic of Jason and the Argonauts, where Pelasgian women killed their men, and that of Herodotus‘ narrative where the Pelasgians killed captive mothers and children.

As in other nationalistic epics, non-Greek people and tribes are often deemed to have “barbaric” tendencies. Further, the Pelasgians of Lemnos reportedly spoke a pre-Greek language, which contributed to the construction of narratives emphasizing their alterity.

== Jasonian origin ==
It is said that Pelasgian women decided to kill their men, due to the men's cheating with the mainland Thracian women. In anger, the women slaughtered the men in their sleep and lived without men for many years, until Jason and the Argonauts arrived during The Quest for the Golden Fleece. They mingled with the women and created a new race: the Minyae.

== Pelasgian origin ==
Michael Stewart relates the story of Herodotus thus:

The historian, Herodotus, relates the story that when the Pelasgians were driven from Attika (Attica) they kidnapped a number of Athenian women and took them to Lemnos; the women were defiant and taught their children to act and speak like Athenians; the Pelasgians would not accept such rebellious attitudes and killed the captive mothers and children and thus the term Lemnian Deeds became an enduring insult to the honor and manhood of the inhabitants.
