= Lemnos =

Greek island in the northern Aegean Sea

Lemnos Λήμνος
- Municipality
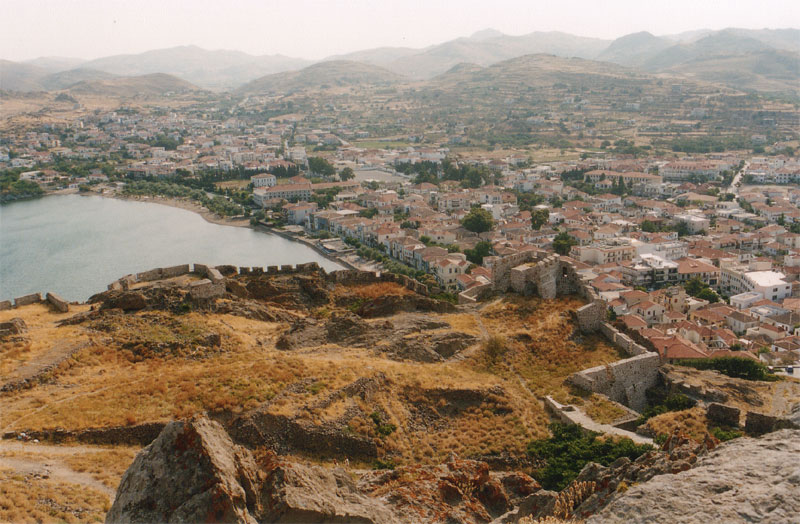
- Panorama of Myrina

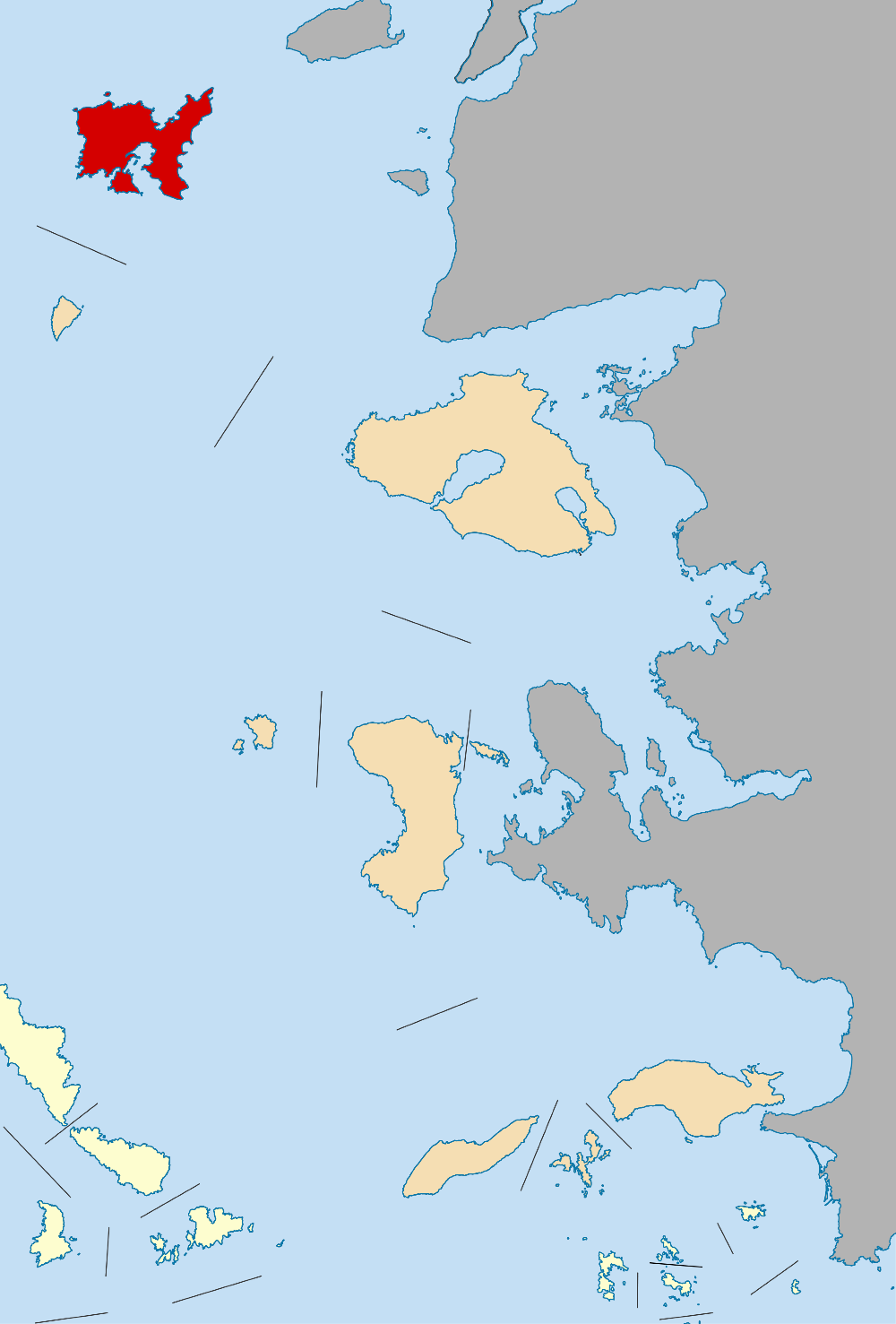

- Location within Greece
- Coordinates: 39°55′N 25°15′E
- Country: Greece
- Administrative region: North Aegean
- Regional unit: Lemnos
- Seat: Myrina

Area
  - Municipality: 477.6 km^{2} (184.4 sq mi)
- Highest elevation: 470 m (1,540 ft)
- Lowest elevation: 0 m (0 ft)

Population (2021)
  - Municipality: 16,411
  - Density: 34.36/km^{2} (89.00/sq mi)
- Time zone: UTC+2 (EET)
  - Summer (DST): UTC+3 (EEST)
- Postal code: 81400
- Area code: 22540
- Vehicle registration: MH, MY
- Website: limnos.gr

Lemnos (Ancient Greek: Λῆμνος [ˈlɛ̂ːmnos]) or Limnos (Modern Greek: Λήμνος [ˈlimnos]) is a Greek island in the northern Aegean Sea. Administratively the island forms a separate municipality within the Lemnos regional unit, which is part of the North Aegean region. The principal town of the island and seat of the municipality is Myrina. At 477.583 square kilometres (184.396 sq mi), it is the 8th-largest island of Greece.

== Geography ==
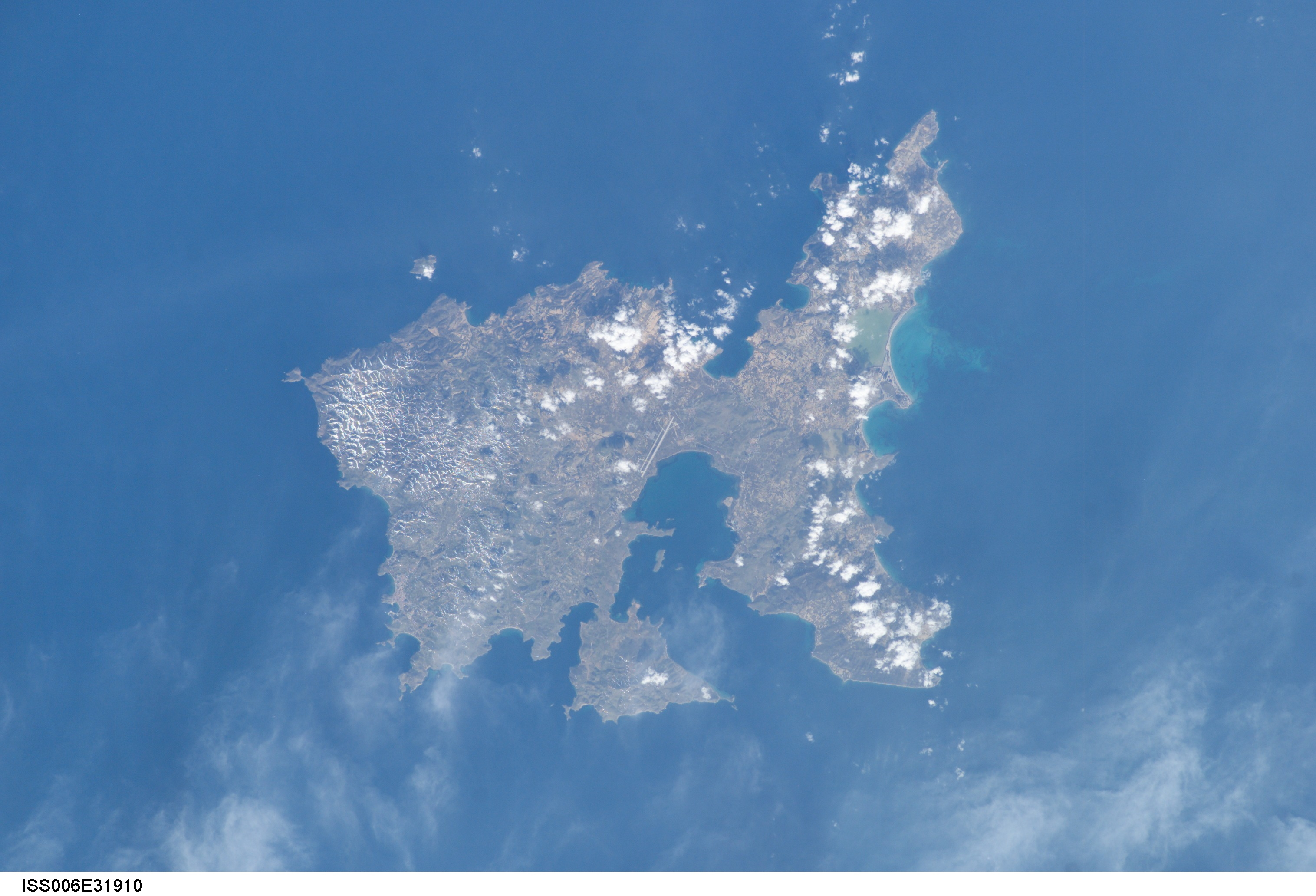
Lemnos from space

Lemnos is located in the Aegean Sea, halfway between Mount Athos in northeastern mainland Greece and the western coast of Turkey.

It is primarily a flat island, but the western region, particularly the northwest, is rocky and mountainous. At 430 meters above sea level, Mount Skopia is the highest point. The chief towns are Myrina, on the western coast, and Moudros on the eastern shore of a large bay in the middle of the island. Myrina (also called Kastro, meaning "castle") possesses a good harbour. It is the seat of all trade carried on with the mainland.

Lemnos also has a 7-hectare desert, the Pachies Ammoudies of Lemnos.

=== Climate ===
The climate in Lemnos is mainly Mediterranean (Csa). Winters are generally mild, but with occasional snowfall. Strong winds are a feature of the island, especially in August and during the winter, with a maximum average wind speed of 20.7 km/h in February, hence its nickname "the wind-ridden one" (in Greek, Ανεμόεσσα). The temperature is typically 2 to 5 degrees Celsius less than in Athens, especially in summertime.

Climate data for Lemnos Island (1974-2010)
Month	Jan	Feb	Mar	Apr	May	Jun	Jul	Aug	Sep	Oct	Nov	Dec	Year
Record high °C (°F)	18.8 (65.8)	19.0 (66.2)	22.0 (71.6)	25.8 (78.4)	29.8 (85.6)	34.4 (93.9)	39.4 (102.9)	35.8 (96.4)	32.8 (91.0)	31.2 (88.2)	24.0 (75.2)	19.2 (66.6)	39.4 (102.9)
Mean daily maximum °C (°F)	10.7 (51.3)	11.0 (51.8)	13.1 (55.6)	17.1 (62.8)	22.1 (71.8)	27.2 (81.0)	29.5 (85.1)	29.1 (84.4)	25.3 (77.5)	20.3 (68.5)	15.7 (60.3)	12.3 (54.1)	19.5 (67.1)
Daily mean °C (°F)	7.6 (45.7)	7.8 (46.0)	10.0 (50.0)	13.8 (56.8)	18.6 (65.5)	23.8 (74.8)	26.1 (79.0)	25.5 (77.9)	21.6 (70.9)	16.9 (62.4)	12.5 (54.5)	9.3 (48.7)	16.1 (61.0)
Mean daily minimum °C (°F)	4.4 (39.9)	4.5 (40.1)	6.2 (43.2)	9.0 (48.2)	13.0 (55.4)	17.3 (63.1)	20.4 (68.7)	20.7 (69.3)	16.7 (62.1)	12.9 (55.2)	9.1 (48.4)	6.2 (43.2)	11.7 (53.1)
Record low °C (°F)	−5.0 (23.0)	−4.2 (24.4)	−6.0 (21.2)	1.0 (33.8)	3.4 (38.1)	3.4 (38.1)	12.0 (53.6)	12.8 (55.0)	8.8 (47.8)	1.6 (34.9)	−1.0 (30.2)	−3.6 (25.5)	−6.0 (21.2)
Average precipitation mm (inches)	66.5 (2.62)	55.6 (2.19)	51.5 (2.03)	36.4 (1.43)	21.6 (0.85)	15.5 (0.61)	11.0 (0.43)	6.3 (0.25)	29.3 (1.15)	43.9 (1.73)	80.4 (3.17)	84.7 (3.33)	502.7 (19.79)
Average precipitation days (≥ 0.01 mm)	11.3	10.7	9.6	8.9	6.6	4.7	2.1	2.3	4.0	7.1	10.1	12.9	90.3
Average relative humidity (%)	77.3	74.9	74.9	73.4	68.1	59.9	57.0	61.0	66.8	73.7	77.9	78.5	70.3
Source 1: NOAA
Source 2: HNMS

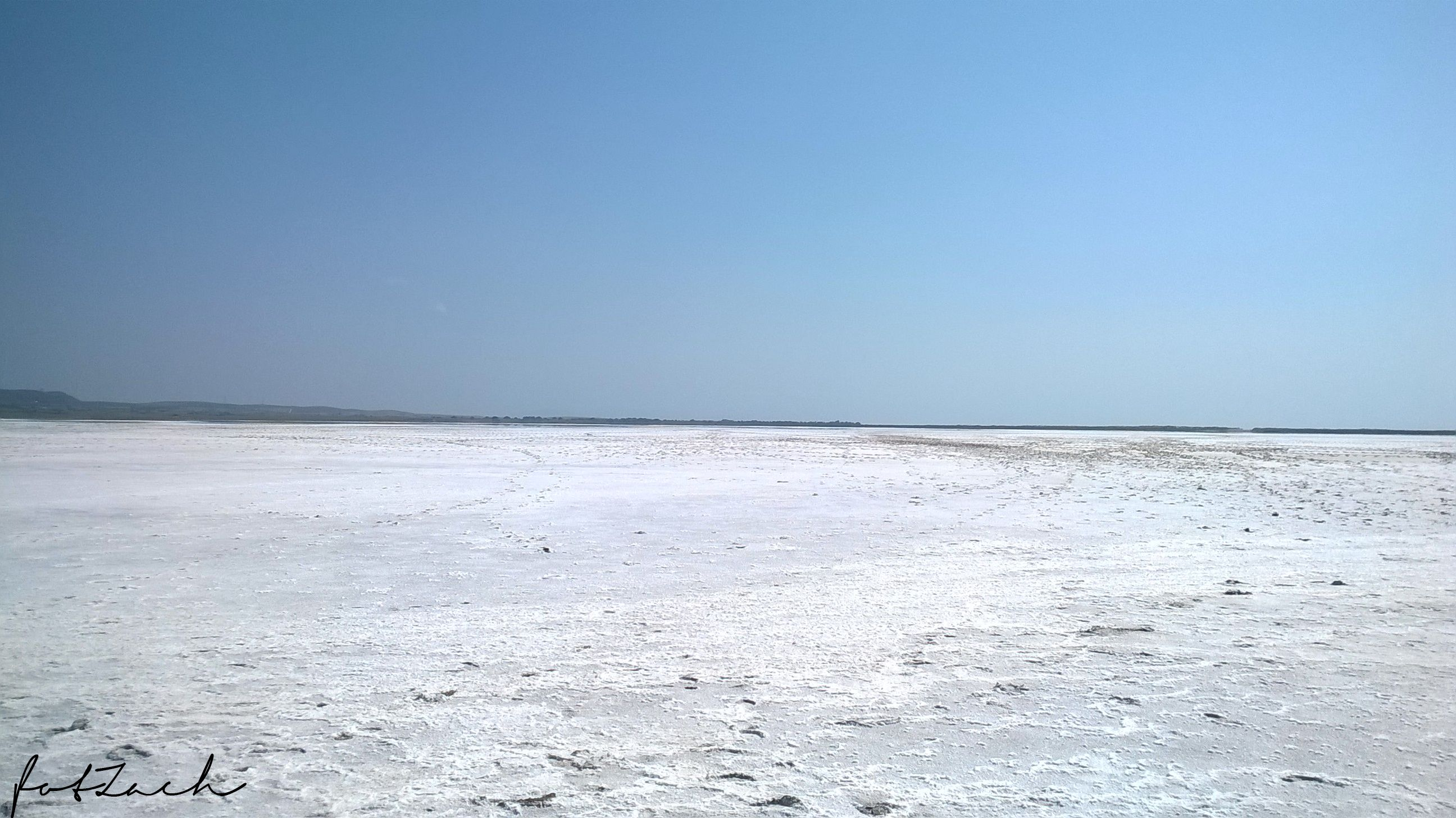
Salt lake of Lemnos

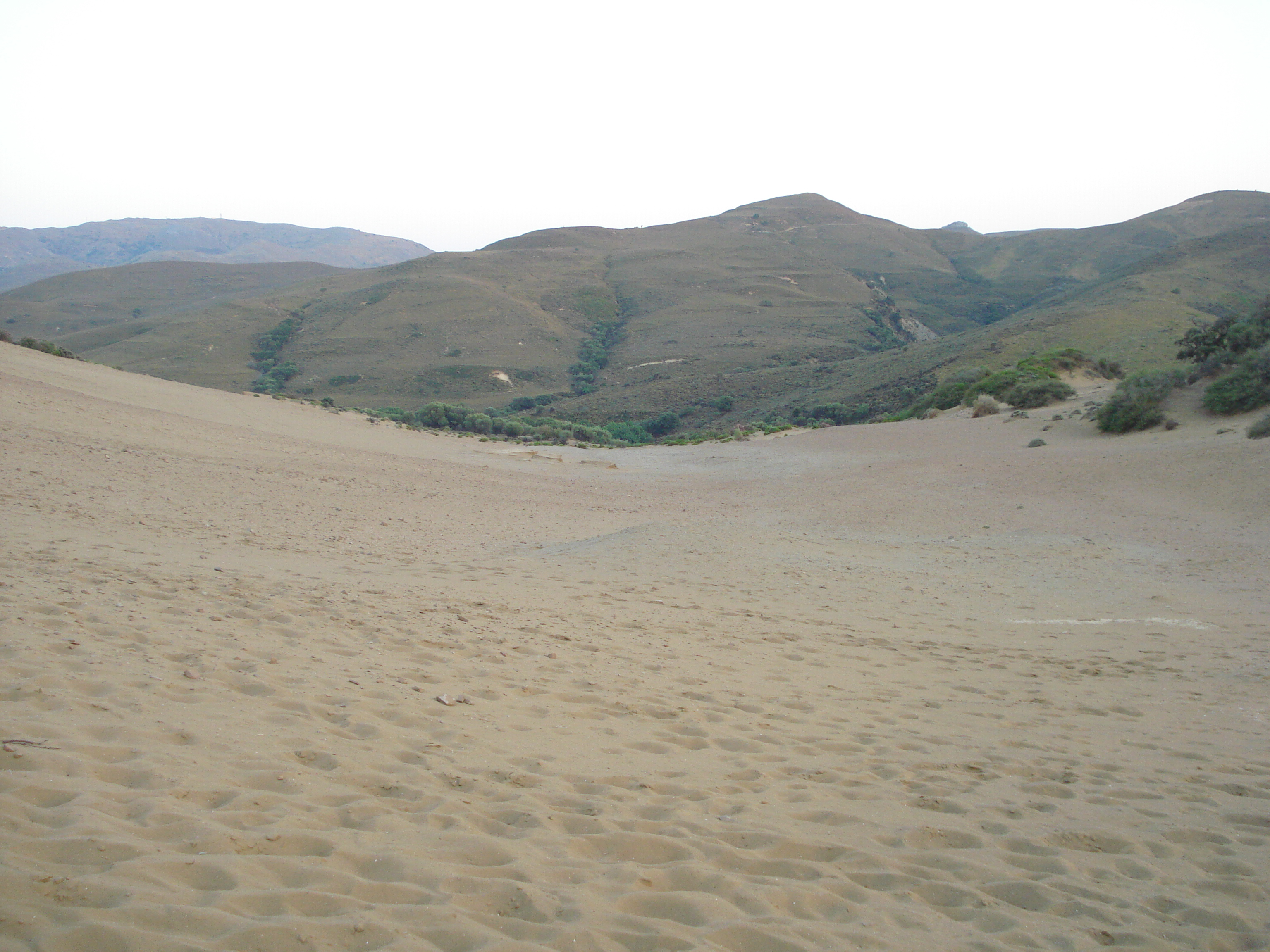
Sand dunes

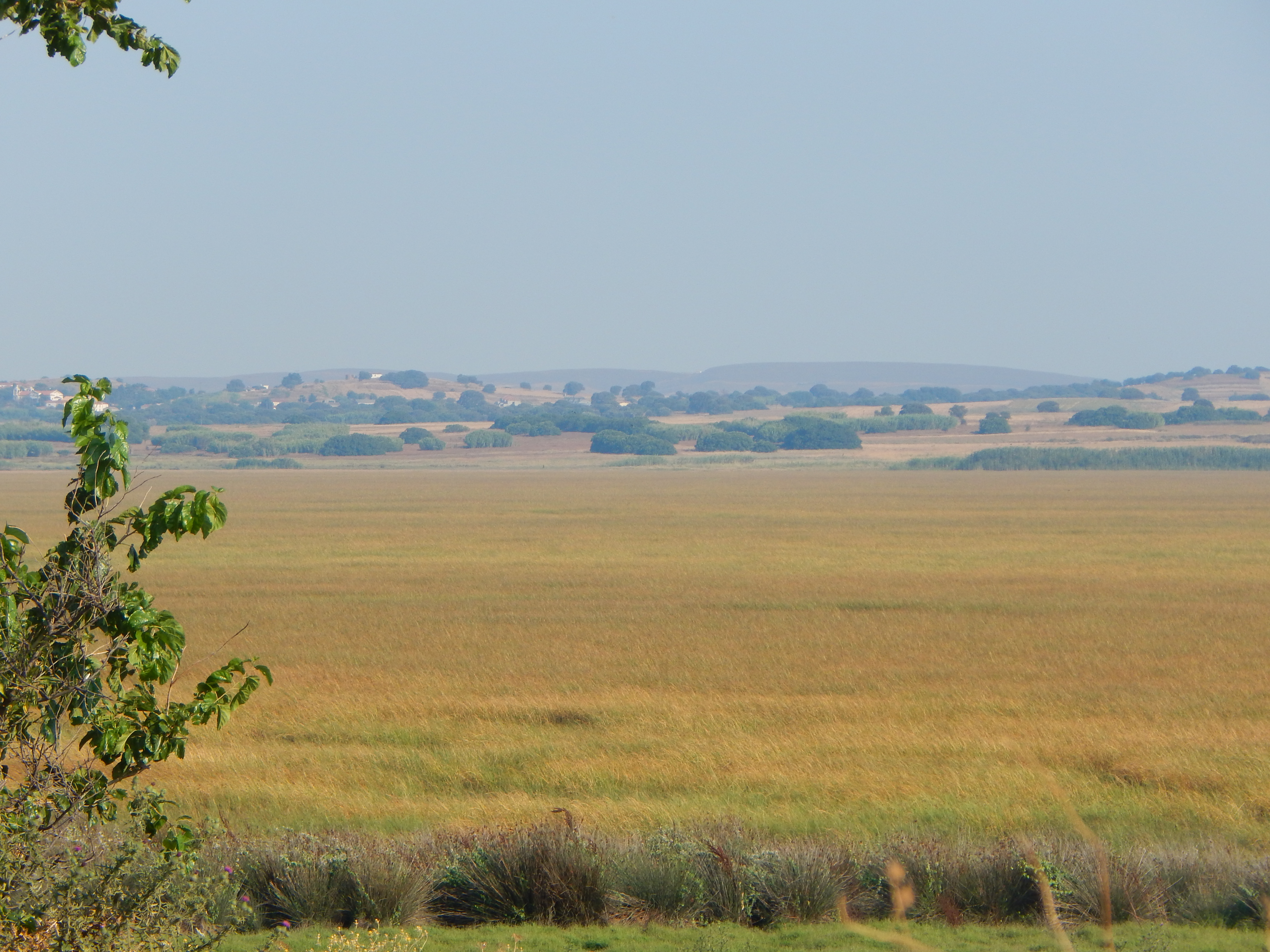
Landscape of Chortarolimni

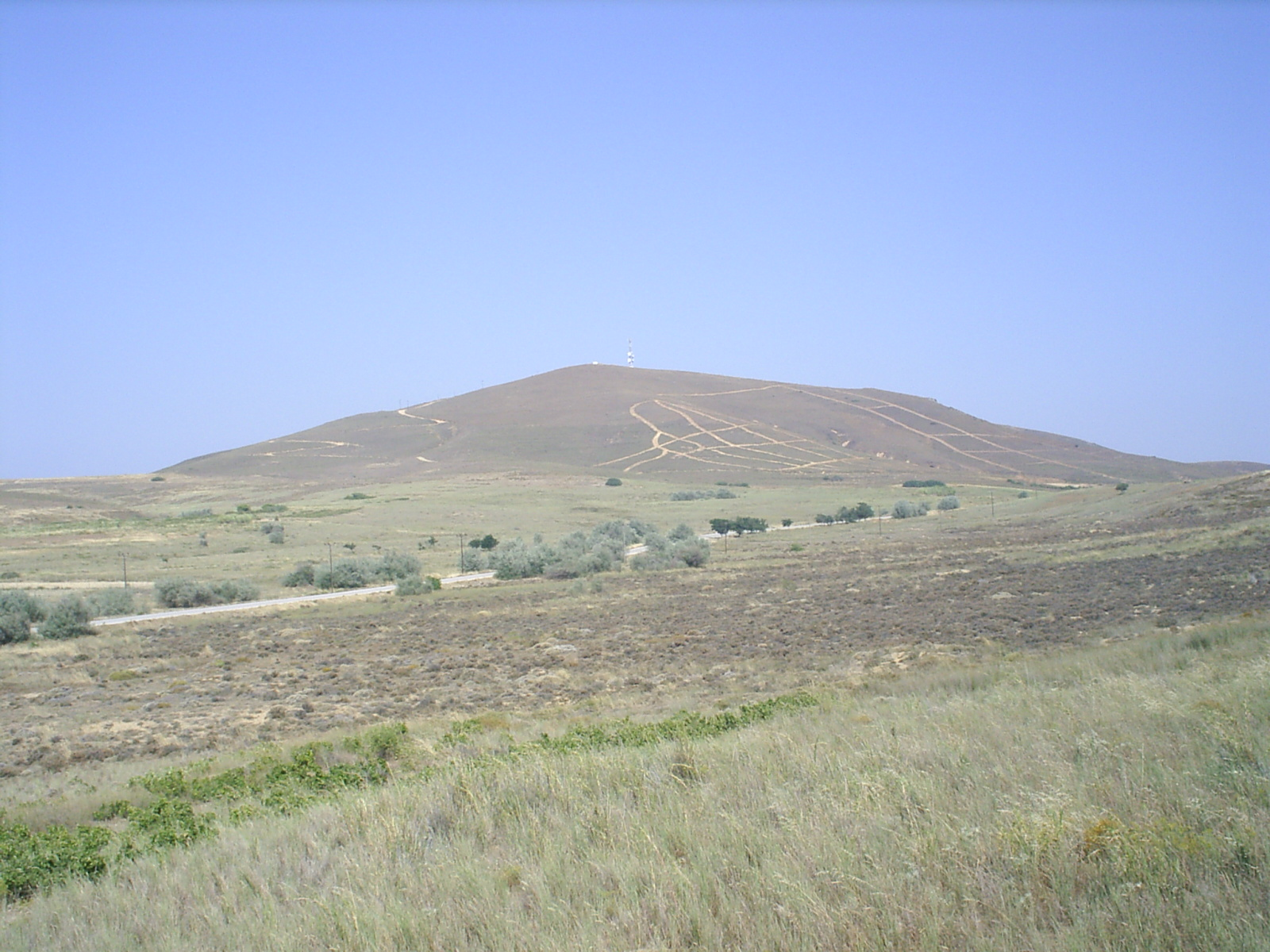
Paradisi hill

== Mythic Lemnos ==
For ancient Greeks, the island was sacred to Hephaestus, god of metallurgy, who—as he tells himself in Iliad I.590ff—fell on Lemnos when Zeus hurled him headlong out of Olympus. There, he was cared for by the Sinties, according to Iliad, or by Thetis (Apollodorus, Bibliotheca I:3.5), and there with a Thracian nymph Cabiro (a daughter of Proteus) he fathered a tribe called the Kaberoi. Sacred initiatory rites dedicated to them were performed in the island. Its ancient capital was named Hephaistia in the god's honour.

Hephaestus's forge, which was located on Lemnos, as well as the name Aethaleia, sometimes applied to it, points to its volcanic character. It is said that fire occasionally blazed forth from Mosychlos, one of its mountains. The ancient geographer Pausanias relates that a small island called Chryse, off the Lemnian coast, was swallowed up by the sea. All volcanic action is now extinct.

The earliest inhabitants are said to have been a Thracian tribe, whom the Greeks called Sintians, "robbers". The name Lemnos is said by Hecataeus to have been applied in the form of a title to Cybele among the Thracians. The worship of Cybele was characteristic of Thrace, where it had spread from Asia Minor at a very early period. Hypsipyle and Myrina (the name of one of the chief towns) are Amazon names, which are always connected with Asiatic Cybele-worship.

According to the epitome of the Bibliotheca traditionally attributed to Apollodorus (Epitome I:9), when Dionysus found Ariadne abandoned on Naxos, he brought her to Lemnos and there fathered Thoas, Staphylus, Oenopion, and Peparethus. Pliny the Elder in his Natural History (xxxvi. 13) speaks of a remarkable labyrinth in Lemnos, which has not been identified in modern times.

According to a Hellenic legend, the women were all deserted by their husbands for Thracian women, and in revenge they murdered every man on the island. From this barbarous act, the expression Lemnian deeds became proverbial among the Hellenes. According to Apollonius of Rhodes's Argonautica the Argonauts landing soon after found only women in the island, ruled by Hypsipyle, daughter of the old king Thoas. From the Argonauts and the Lemnian women were descended the race called Minyans, whose king Euneus, son of Jason and Hypsipyle, sent wine and provisions to the Achaeans at Troy. According to later Greek historians, the Minyans were expelled by a Pelasgian tribe who came from Attica.

The historical element underlying these traditions is probably that the original Thracian people were gradually brought into communication with the Greeks as navigation began to unite the scattered islands of the Aegean; the Thracian inhabitants were technologically primitive in comparison with the Greek mariners.

In another legend, Philoctetes was left on Lemnos by the Greeks on their way to Troy; and there he suffered ten years' agony from his wounded foot, until Odysseus and Neoptolemus induced him to accompany them to Troy. According to Sophocles, he lived beside Mount Hermaeus, which Aeschylus makes one of the beacon points to flash the news of Troy's downfall home to Argos.

== History ==
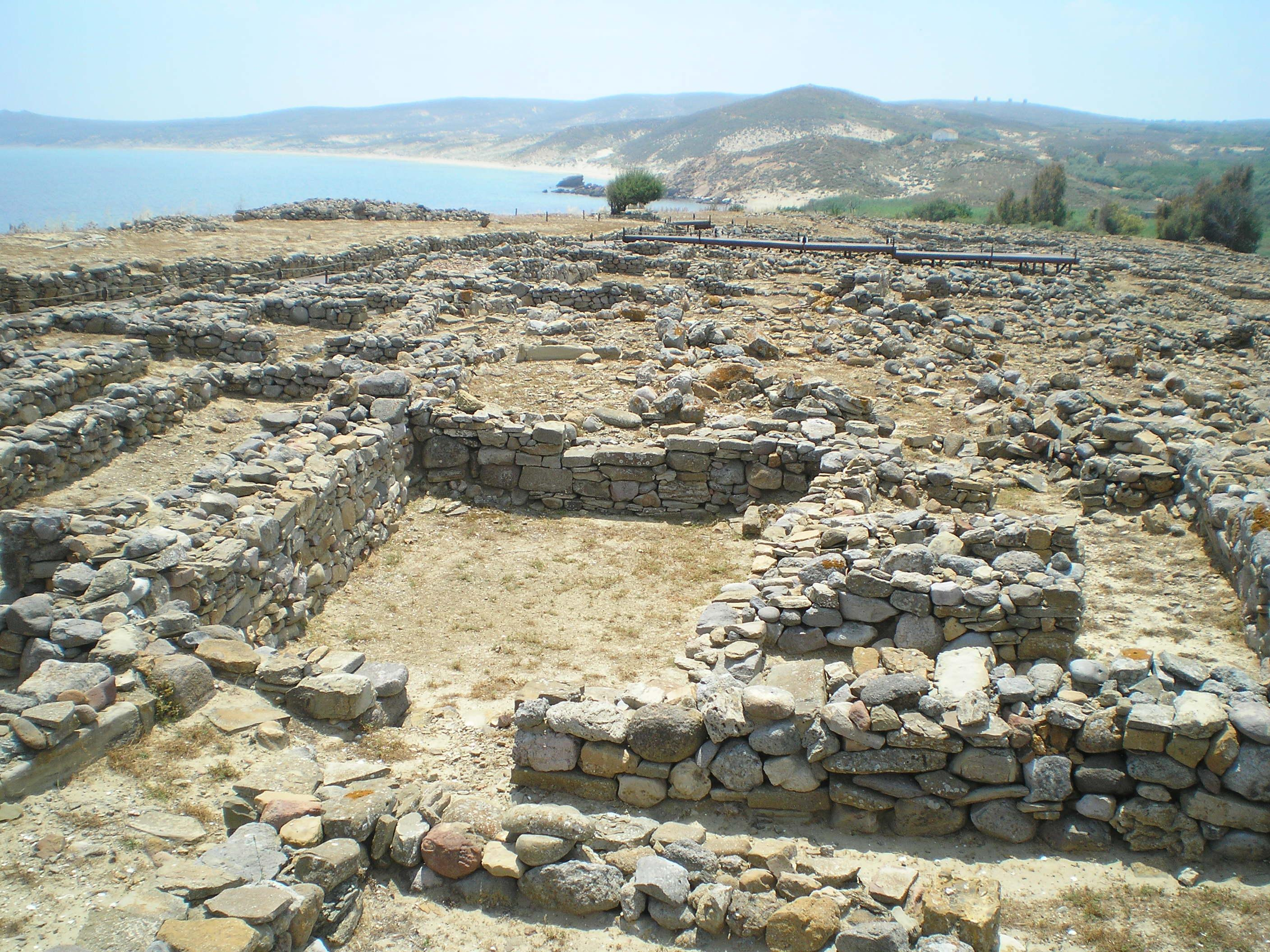
Building at the hill of Poliochne, dating from the early Bronze Age

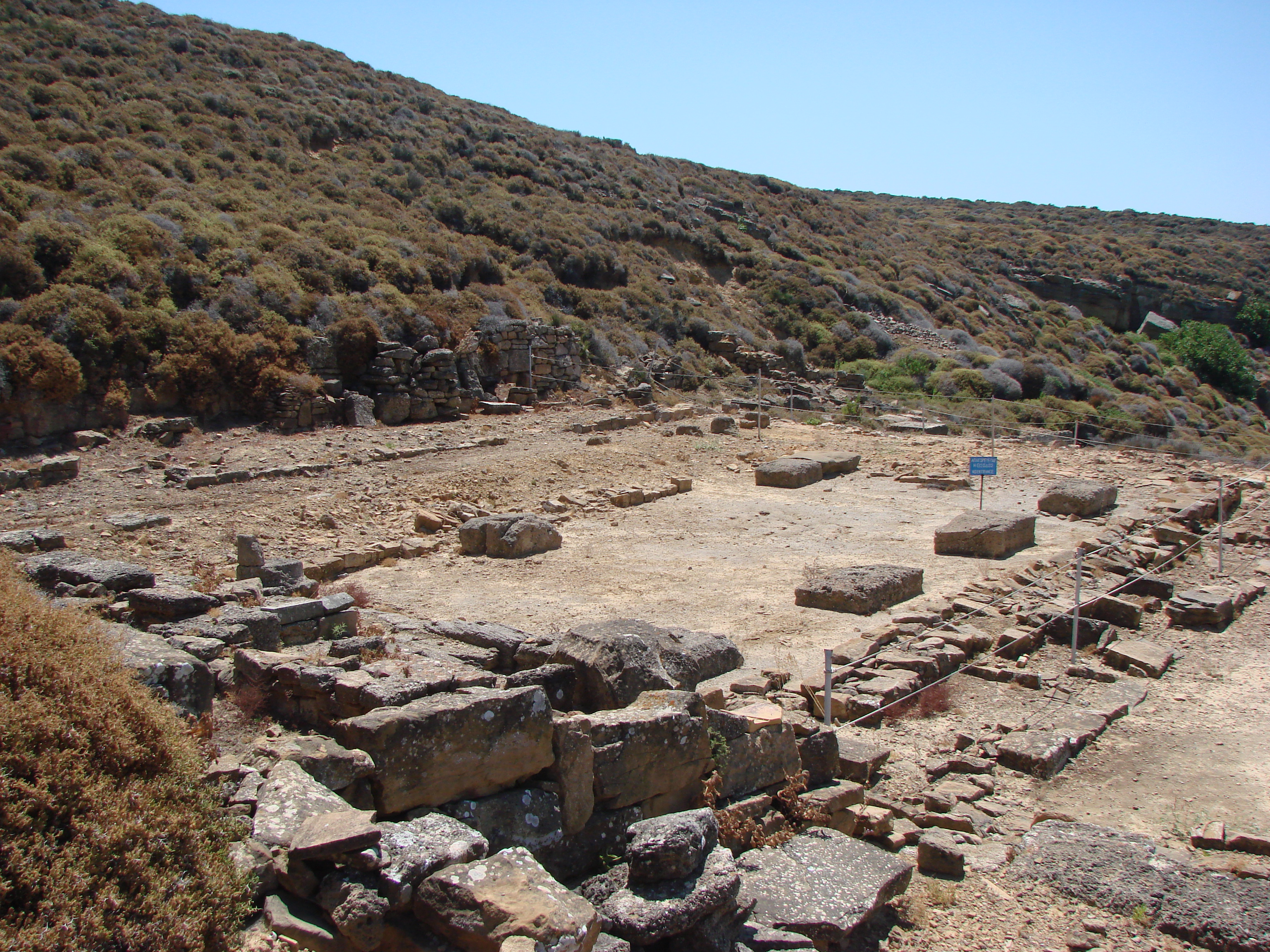
Kabeirio archaeological site

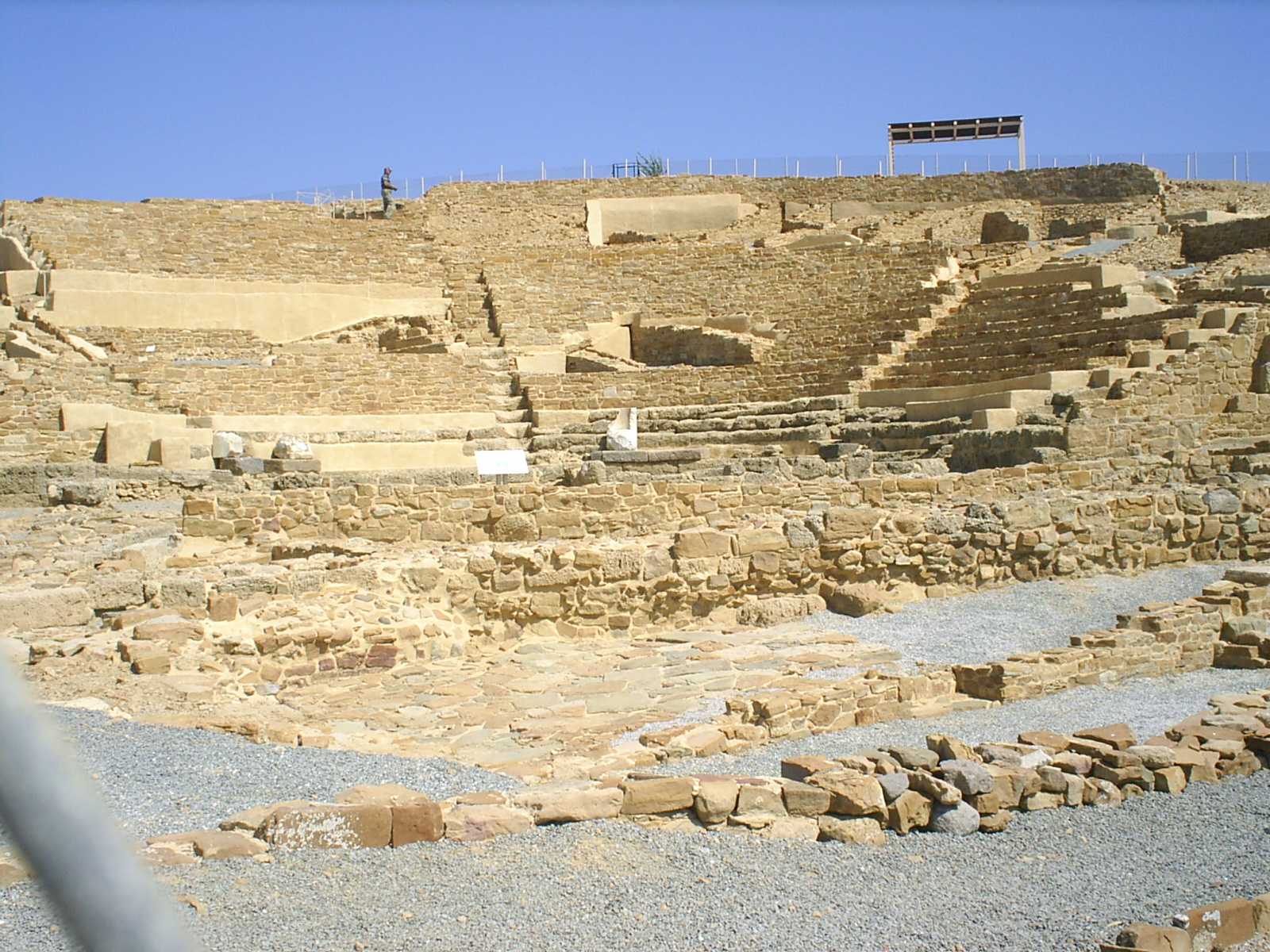
Ancient theatre in Hephaistia

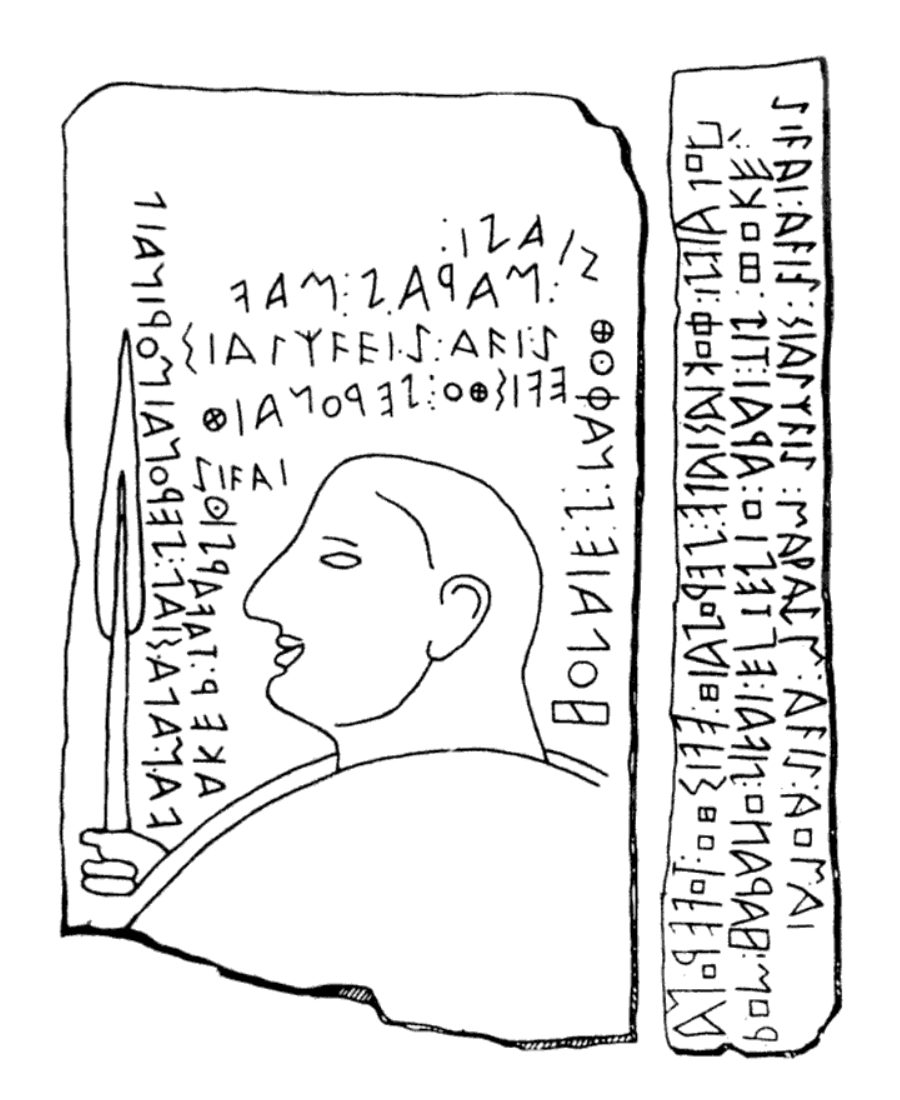
The Lemnos stele, Lemnian (related to Etruscan) inscriptions discovered in a crypt

=== Prehistory ===
The ruins of the oldest human settlement in the Aegean Islands found so far have been unearthed in archaeological excavations on Lemnos by a team of Greek, Italian and American archaeologists at the Ouriakos site on the Louri coast of Fyssini in Moudros municipality. The excavation began in early June 2009 and the finds brought to light, consisting mainly of high quality stone tools, are from the Epipaleolithic Period, indicating a settlement of hunters and gatherers and fishermen of the 12th millennium BC.

A rectangular building with a double row of stepped seats on the long sides, at the southwest side of the hill of Poliochne, dates back to the Early Bronze Age and was possibly used as a kind of Bouleuterion.

In August and September 1926, members of the Italian School of Archaeology at Athens conducted trial excavations on the island. The overall purpose of the excavations was to shed light on the island's pre-Hellenic "Etrusco-Pelasgian" civilization, following the discovery of the "Lemnos stele", bearing an inscription philologists related to the Etruscan language. The excavations, with then-current political overtones, were conducted on the site of the city of Hephaistia (i. e., Palaiopolis) where the Pelasgians, according to Herodotus, surrendered to Miltiades of Athens in 510 BC, initiating the social and political Hellenization of the island. There, a necropolis (ca. 9th–8th centuries BC) was discovered, revealing bronze objects, pots, and over 130 ossuaries. The ossuaries contained distinctly male and female funeral ornaments. Male ossuaries contained knives and axes whereas female ossuaries contained earrings, bronze pins, necklaces, gold-diadems, and bracelets. The decorations on some of the gold objects contained spirals of Mycenaean origin, but had no Geometric forms. According to their ornamentation, the pots discovered at the site were from the Geometric period. However, the pots also preserved spirals indicative of Mycenaean art. The results of the excavations indicate that the Early Iron Age inhabitants of Lemnos could be a remnant of a Mycenaean population and, in addition, the earliest attested reference to Lemnos is the Mycenaean Greek ra-mi-ni-ja, "Lemnian woman", written in Linear B syllabic script. Professor Della Seta reports:

The lack of weapons of bronze, the abundance of weapons of iron, and the type of the pots and the pins gives the impression that the necropolis belongs to the ninth or eighth century B.C. That it did not belong to a Greek population, but to a population which, in the eyes of the Hellenes, appeared barbarous, is shown by the weapons. The Greek weapon, dagger or spear, is lacking: the weapons of the barbarians, the axe and the knife, are common. Since, however, this population … preserves so many elements of Mycenaean art, the Tyrrhenians or Pelasgians of Lemnos may be recognized as a remnant of a Mycenaean population.

=== Antiquity ===
According to Homer, Lemnos was inhabited by the Sintians. Thucydides mentions Tyrrhenians as the pre-Greek inhabitants.

Homer speaks as if there were one town in the island called Lemnos. In Classical times there were two towns, Myrina (also called Kastro) and Hephaistia, which was the chief town. Coins from Hephaestia are found in considerable number, and various types including the goddess Athena with her owl, native religious symbols, the caps of the Dioscuri, Apollo, etc. Few coins of Myrina are known. They belong to the period of Attic occupation, and bear Athenian types. A few coins are also known which bear the name of the whole island, rather than of either city.

A trace of the Lemnian language is found on a 6th-century inscription on a funerary stele, the Lemnos stele. Lemnos later adopted the Attic dialect of Athens.

Coming down to a better authenticated period, it is reported that Lemnos was conquered by Otanes, a general of Darius Hystaspis. But soon (510 BC) it was reconquered by Miltiades the Younger, the tyrant of the Thracian Chersonese. Miltiades later returned to Athens and Lemnos was an Athenian possession until the Macedonian empire absorbed it. By 450 BC, Lemnos was an Athenian klēroukhia (or cleruchy, i.e. a dependency subject to direct rule by Athens). The Athenian settlers brought with them Athenian drama, dated to at least 348 BC. However, the tradition of theater seems to date back to the 5th century, and recent excavations at the site Hephaisteia suggest that the theater dated to the late 6th to early 5th century.

On a barren island near Lemnos there was an altar of Philoctetes with a brazen serpent, bows and breastplate bound with strips, to remind of the sufferings of the hero.

In 197 BC, the Romans declared it free, but in 166 BC gave it over to Athens which retained nominal possession of it until the whole of Greece was made a province of the Roman Republic in 146 BC.

Pliny the Elder writes about a labyrinth on Lemnos which was built by the Lemnian architects Zmilis, Rhoecus, and Theodorus.

=== Middle Ages ===
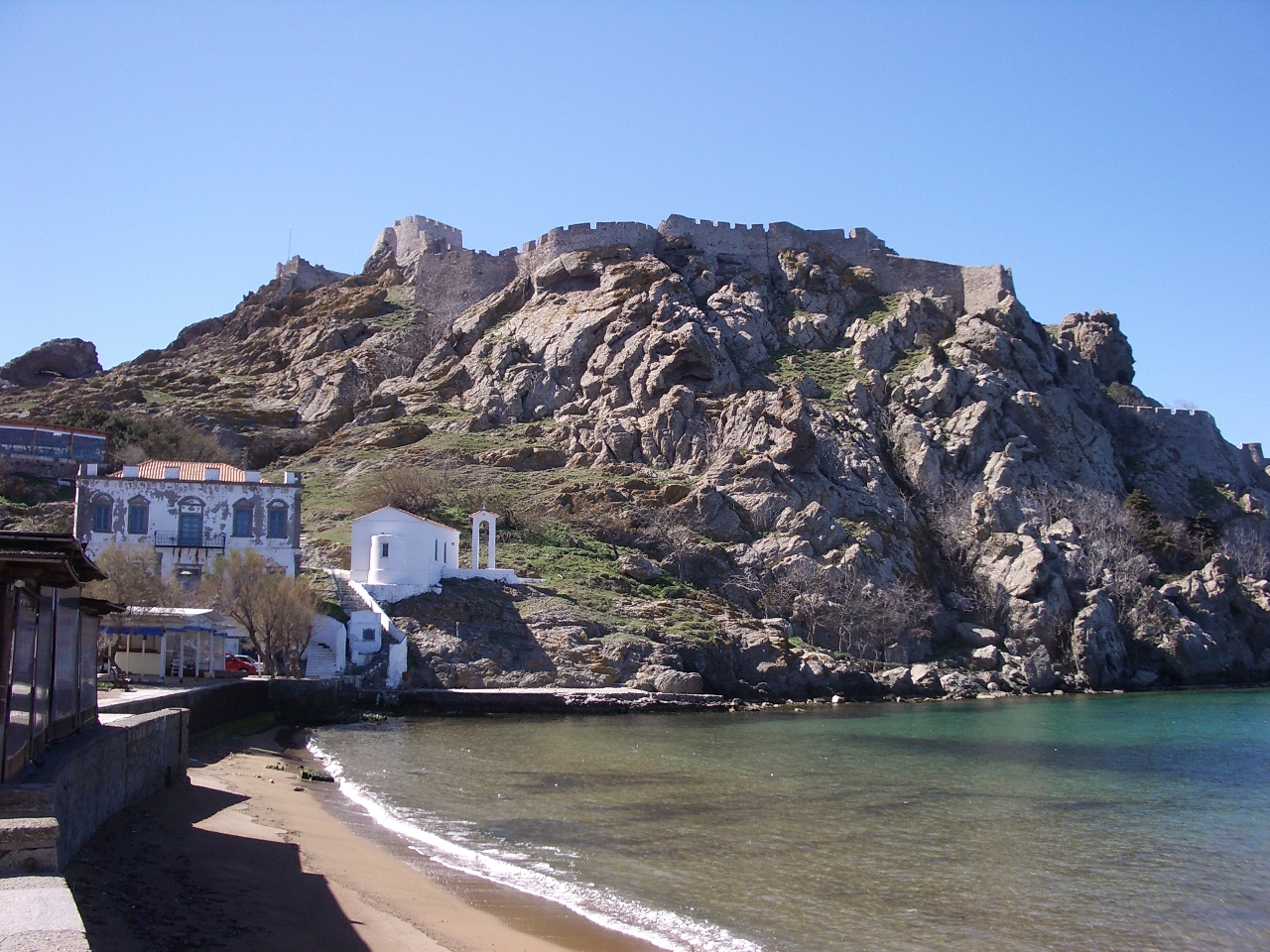
View of the fortress of Myrina

As a province of the Byzantine Empire, Lemnos belonged to the theme of the Aegean Sea, and was a target of Saracen raids in the 10th century and of Seljuk raids in the 11th century. Following the dissolution and division of the Empire after the Fourth Crusade, Lemnos (known by Westerners as Stalimene) was apportioned to the Latin Empire, and given as a fief to the Navigajoso family under the Venetian (or possibly of mixed Greek and Venetian descent) megadux Filocalo Navigajoso. Filocalo died in 1214, and was succeeded by his son Leonardo and his daughters, who partitioned the island into three fiefs between them. Leonardo retained the title of megadux of the Latin Empire and half the island with the capital, Kastro, while his sisters and their husbands received one quarter each with the fortresses of Moudros and Kotsinos. Leonardo died in 1260 and was succeeded by his son Paolo Navigajoso, who resisted Byzantine attempts at reconquest until his death during a siege of the island by the Byzantine admiral Licario in 1277. Resistance continued by his wife, but in 1278 the Navigajosi were forced to capitulate and cede the island back to Byzantium.

During the last centuries of Byzantium, Lemnos played a prominent role: following the loss of Asia Minor, it was a major source of food, and it played an important role in the recurring civil wars of the 14th century. As the Ottoman threat mounted in the 15th century, possession of Lemnos was demanded by Alfonso V of Aragon in exchange for offering assistance to the beleaguered Byzantines, while the last Byzantine emperor, Constantine XI Palaiologos, offered it to the Genoese captain Giustiniani Longo, if the Ottoman besiegers were driven off. Dorino I Gattilusio, the ruler of Lesbos, also acquired Lemnos as his fief shortly before the Fall of Constantinople in 1453.

=== Ottoman period ===
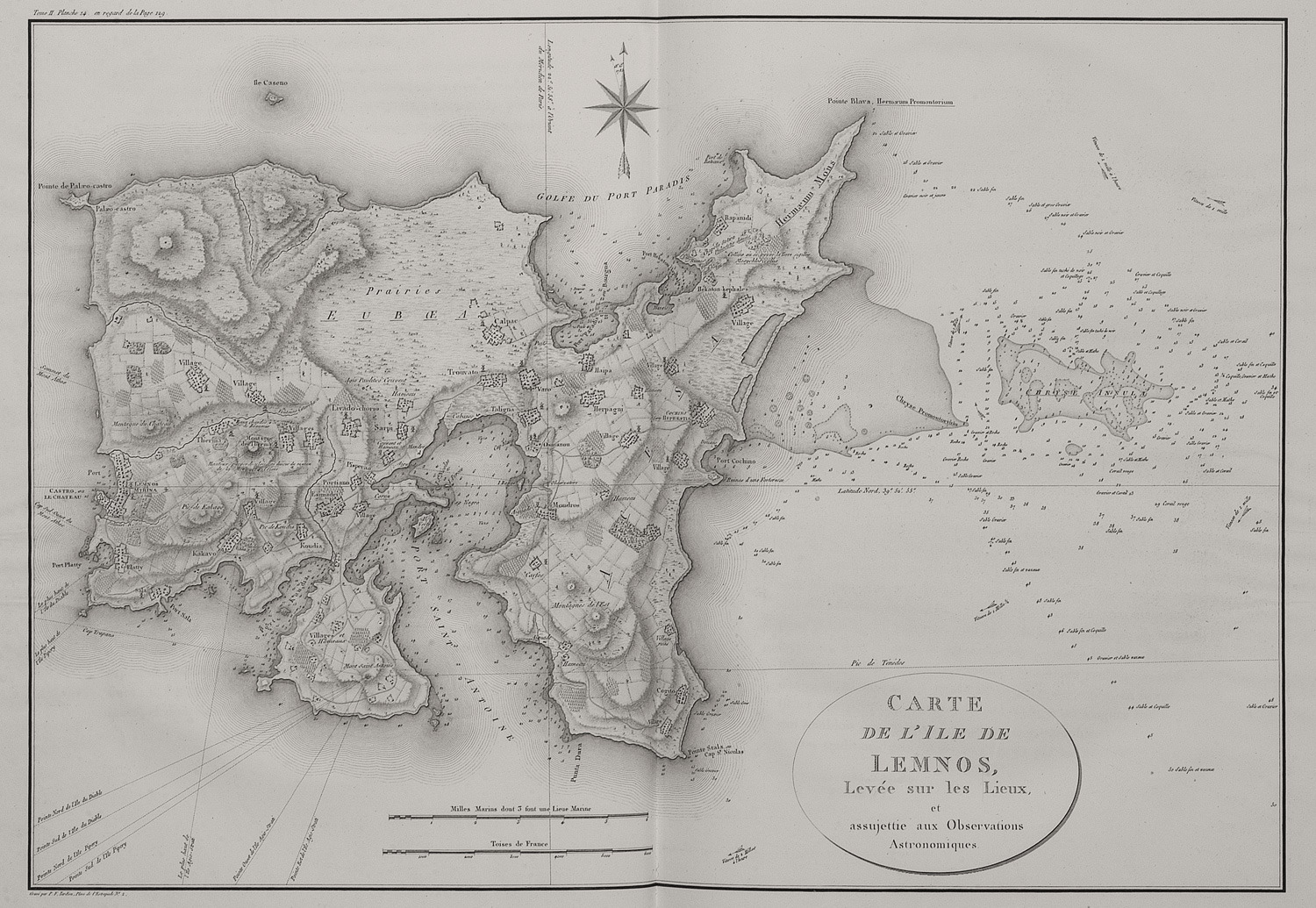
Map of Lemnos, 1809

Following the fall of Constantinople (1453), and thanks to the intercession of Michael Critobulus, Sultan Mehmed II recognized Dorino I Gattilusio's possession of Lemnos and Thasos in exchange for an annual tribute of 2,325 gold coins. When Dorino died in 1455, his son and successor Domenico was only granted Lemnos, however. In 1456, Mehmed II attacked and captured the Gattilusi domains in Thrace (Ainos and the islands of Samothrace and Imbros). During the subsequent negotiations with Domenico Gattilusio, the Greek populace of Lemnos rose up against Domenico's younger brother Niccolò Gattilusio and submitted to the Sultan, who appointed a certain Hamza Bey as governor under the Bey of Gallipoli, Isma'il. Mehmed granted a special legal charter (kanun-name) to Lemnos, Imbros, and Thasos, at this time, later revised by Selim I in 1519. In 1457 a Papal fleet under Cardinal Ludovico Scarampi Mezzarota captured the island. Pope Callixtus III (in office 1455–1458) hoped to establish a new military order on the island, which controlled the exit of the Dardanelles, but nothing came of it as Isma'il Bey soon recovered Lemnos for the Sultan.

In 1464, during the First Ottoman–Venetian War, the Venetians seized Lemnos and other former Gattilusi possessions, but the area reverted to Ottoman control in accordance with the 1479 Treaty of Constantinople. In the aftermath, the Kapudan Pasha, Gedik Ahmed, repaired the island's fortifications and brought in settlers from Anatolia. At this time, the administration of the island was also reformed and brought in line with Ottoman practice, with a governor (voevoda), judge (kadi), and elders (kodjabashis) heading the local Greek inhabitants. In the late 16th century, Lemnos is recorded, along with Chios, as "the only prosperous island of the Archipelago". It had 74 villages, three of them inhabited by Turkish Muslims.

In July 1656, during the Fifth Ottoman–Venetian War, the Venetians captured the island again following a major victory over the Ottoman fleet. The Ottomans under Topal Mehmed Pasha recovered it barely a year later, on 15 November 1657, after besieging the capital of Kastro for 63 days. The famous Sufi poet Niyazi Misri was exiled to Lemnos for several years during the late 17th century. In July 1770, Russian forces under Count Alexei Grigoryevich Orlov besieged Kastro for three months during the Russo-Turkish War of 1768–1774. The fortress had just surrendered when an attack by the Ottoman fleet under Cezayirli Gazi Hasan Pasha on the Russian vessels in Mudros Bay forced the Russians to withdraw (9–10 October 1770). Only a few days later, the pasha and Orlov clashed once again at Mudros, which once again resulted in an Ottoman victory.

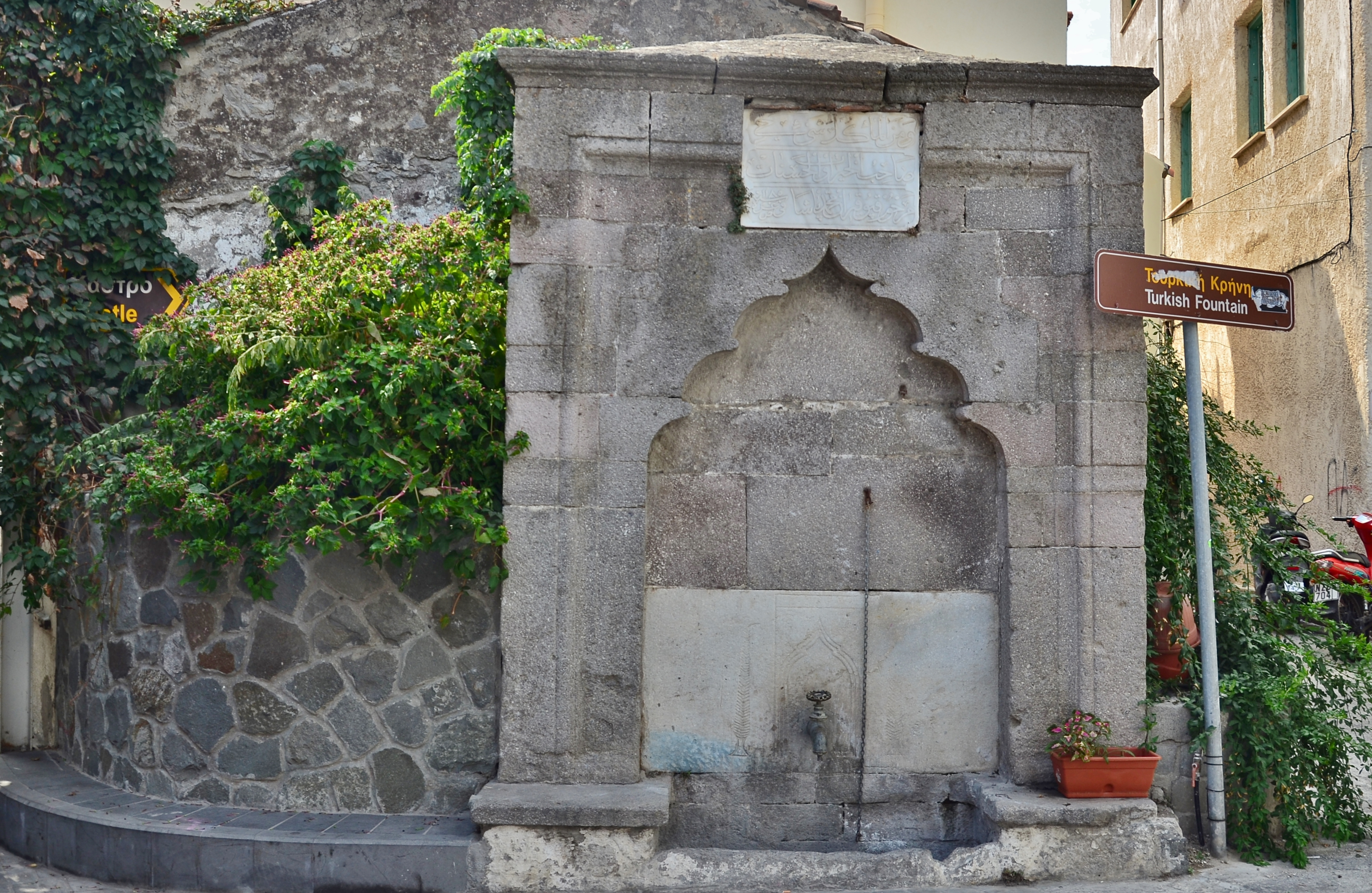
Ottoman fountain in Myrina

Under Ottoman rule, Lemnos initially formed part of the sanjaks of Gallipoli or Mytilene under the Eyalet of the Archipelago, but was constituted as a separate sanjak in the reforms of the mid-19th century, at the latest by 1846. Abolished in 1867, the sanjak was re-formed in 1879 and existed until the island's capture by the Greeks in 1912. It comprised the islands of Lemnos (Limni in Turkish), Agios Efstratios (Bozbaba), Imbros (Imroz) and Tenedos (Bozcaada).

The French scholar Vital Cuinet, in his 1896 work La Turquie d'Asie, recorded a population of 27,079, of which 2,450 were Muslims and the rest Greek Orthodox.

=== Modern period ===
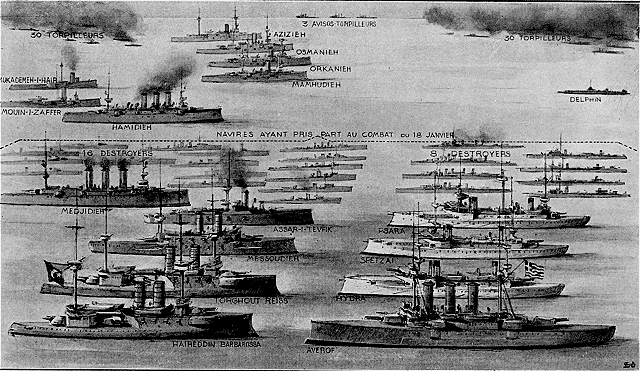
Diagram by the French L'Illustration, depicting the Greek and Ottoman fleets and the warships that participated in the Battle of Lemnos (1913)

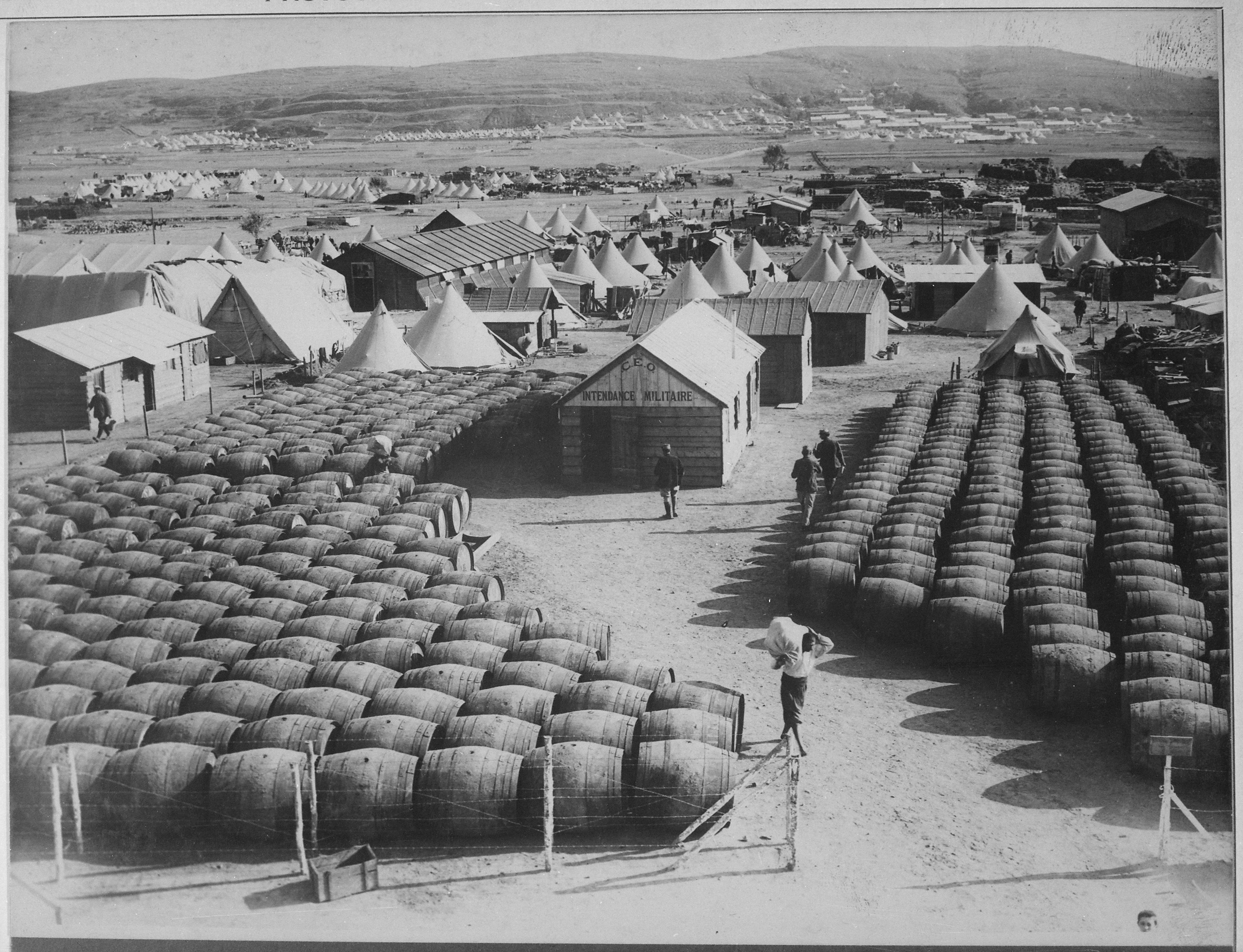
View of Moudros during the Gallipoli campaign in WWI, with a French military wine store in the foreground and a hospital in the background

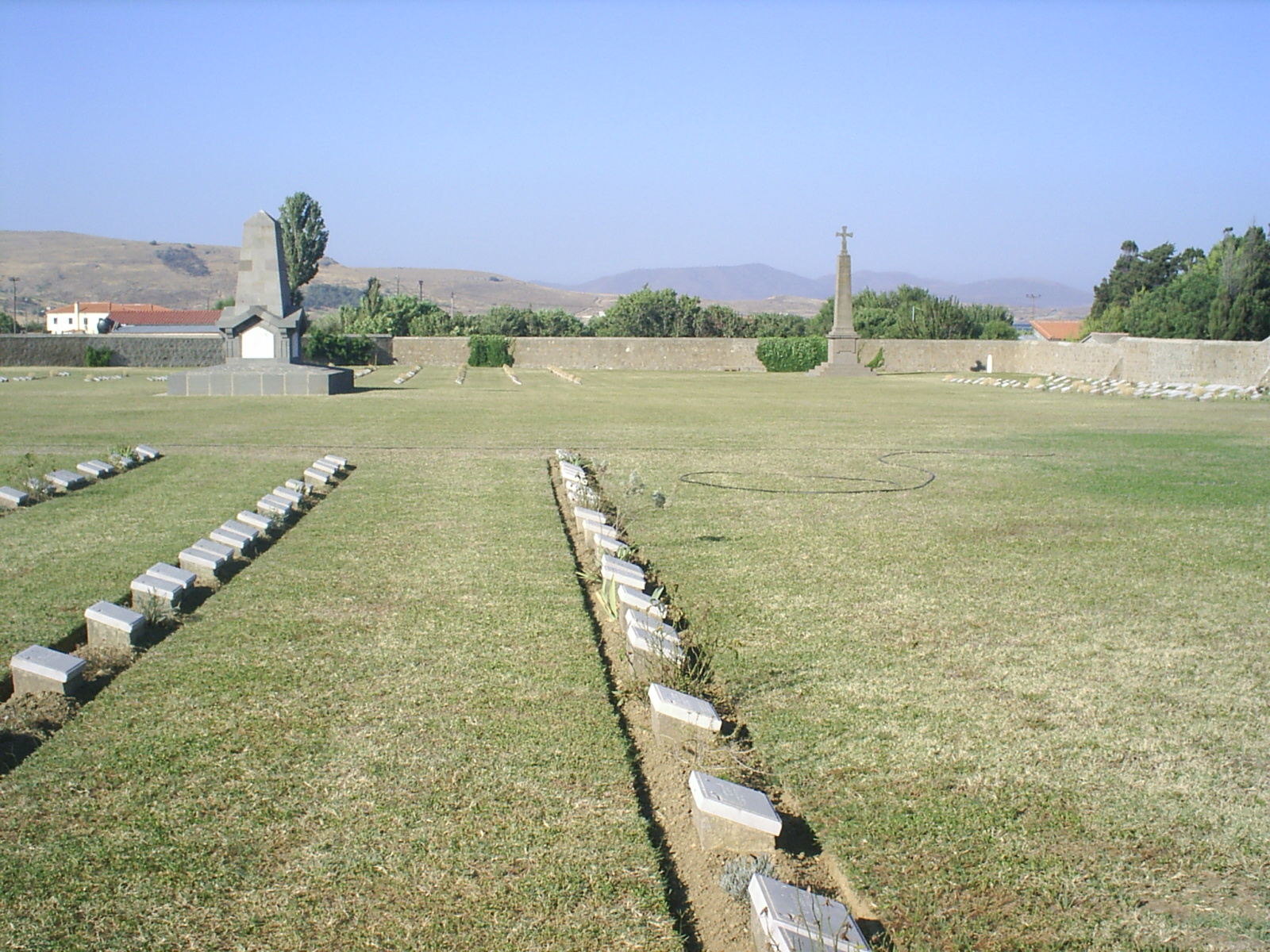
WWI Allied cemetery in Mudros

On 8 October 1912, during the First Balkan War, Lemnos became part of Greece. The Greek navy, under Rear Admiral Pavlos Kountouriotis, captured the island after a brief action, without any casualties among the Ottoman garrison, who were returned to Anatolia. Peter Charanis, who was born on the island in 1908 and later became a professor of Byzantine history at Rutgers University, recounts the liberation of the island and the arrival of Greek soldiers, who were sent to the villages and stationed themselves in the public squares. Some of the children ran to see what Greek soldiers looked like. "What are you looking at?" one of the soldiers asked. "At Hellenes," the children replied. "Are you not Hellenes yourselves?" the soldier retorted. "No, we are Romans." Although this exchange might seem odd at first glance, it indicates that in parts of Greece, locals self-identified as a continuation of the Eastern, Greek-speaking part of the Roman Empire (Ρωμιοί), alongside their Greek identity.

Moudros Bay became a forward anchorage for the Greek fleet, enabling it to keep watch over the Dardanelles and prevent a foray by the Ottoman Navy into the Aegean. The Ottomans' two attempts to achieve this were beaten back in the battles of Elli and Lemnos. The Ottomans were thus prevented from supplying and reinforcing their land forces in Macedonia by sea, a critical factor in the success of the Balkan League in the war.

During World War I, in early 1915, the Allies used the island as a base for their attempt to capture the Dardanelles Straits, some 50 kilometres (31 miles) away. This was done chiefly by the British, largely at the urging of Winston Churchill. The harbour at Moudros was placed under the control of British Admiral Rosslyn Wemyss, who was ordered to prepare the then largely unused harbour for operations against the Dardanelles.

The harbour was broad enough for British and French warships but lacked suitable military facilities, a deficiency that was recognized early on. Troops intended for Gallipoli had to train in Egypt, while the port struggled to cope with casualties from the Gallipoli campaign. The campaign was called off in evident failure at the close of 1915. Moudros's importance subsequently declined, although it remained the Allied base for the blockade of the Dardanelles for the remainder of the war. The town of Lemnos, Victoria, Australia, established in 1927 as a soldier settlement zone for returning First World War soldiers, was named after the island. There are three Commonwealth War Graves Commission (CWGC) cemeteries on the island: the first, at Portianou, contains the graves of 352 Allied soldiers; the second, in the town of Moudros, contains those of 148 Australian and 76 New Zealand soldiers; and the third contains the graves of Ottoman soldiers, including 170 Egyptian and 56 Turkish soldiers.

In late October 1918, the Armistice of Mudros between the Ottoman Empire and the Allies was signed.

After the Red Army victory in the Russian Civil War in 1920, many Kuban Cossacks fled the country to avoid persecution by the Bolsheviks. A notable evacuation point was the Greek island of Lemnos, where 18,000 Kuban Cossacks landed, although many later died of starvation and disease. Most left the island after a year.

During World War II, the island was occupied by the Germans on 25 April 1941 as part of the Axis occupation of Greece, by Infanterie Regiment 382/164. Infanterie-Division under the command of Oberst Wilhelm-Helmuth Beukemann. The same bay of Moudros used by the Allies in the First World War served as a base for German ships controlling the northern Aegean Sea. The occupation forces also included a German punitive battalion, the 999th units, in this case the Afrika-Schützen-Regiment 963 (later Festungs-Infanterie-Bataillon 999). These units included many German and Austrian anti-fascist political prisoners who had been forcibly enrolled, some of whom later joined the Greek People's Liberation Army (ELAS), including Wolfgang Abendroth. Partially evacuated from August 1944, the island was liberated on 16 and 17 October 1944 by the Greek Sacred Band, or Greek Sacred Squadron, under the command of the British Raiding Forces (as part of the SAS or Special Air Service).

Today the island has about 30 villages and settlements. The province includes the island of Agios Efstratios to the southwest which has some exceptional beaches.

== Municipality ==
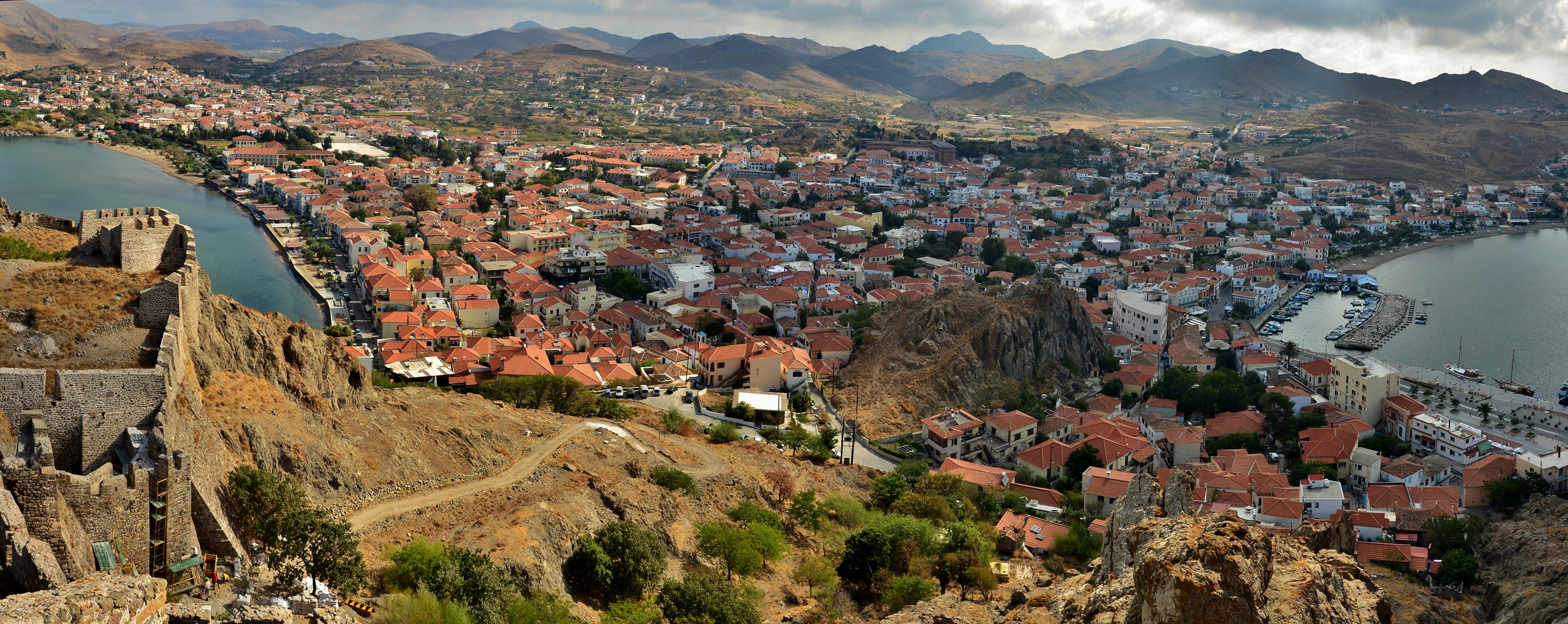
Panoramic view of Myrina

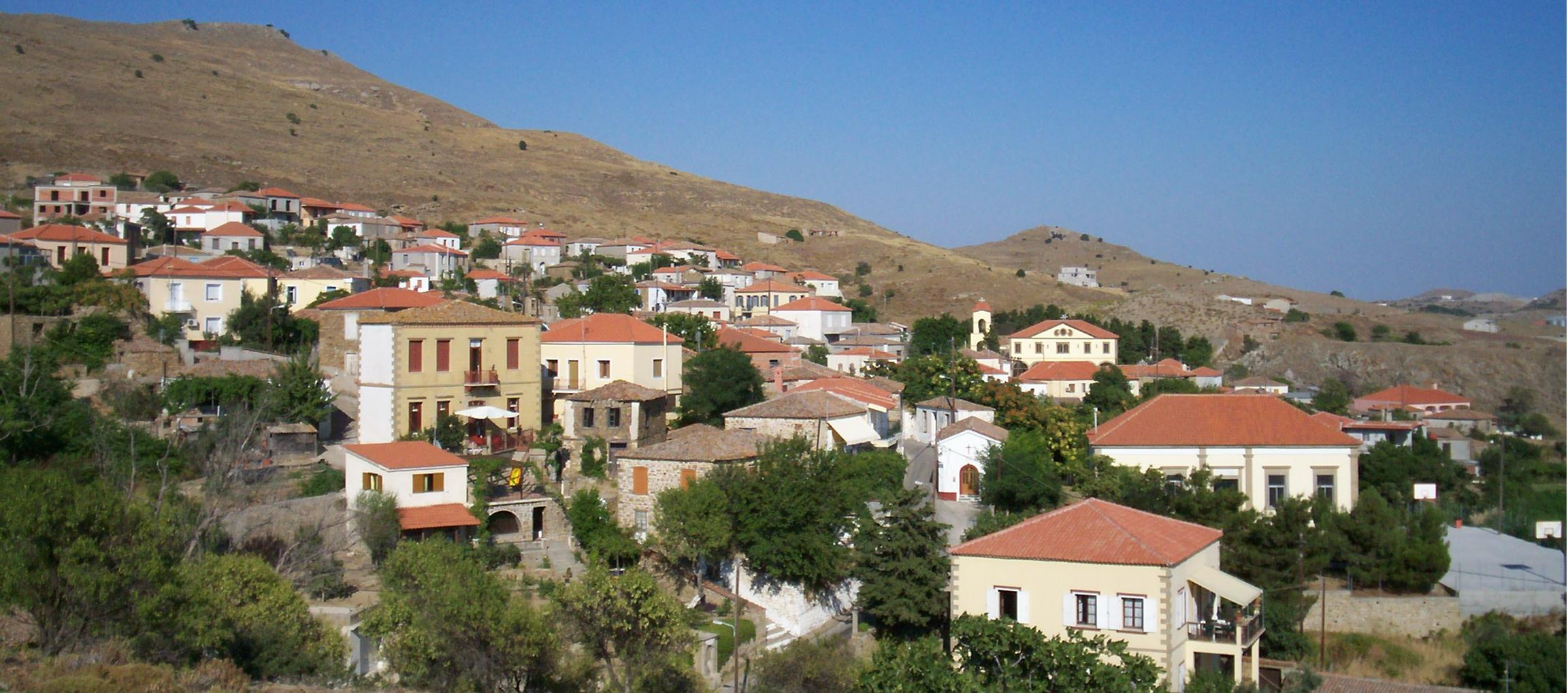
Kornos

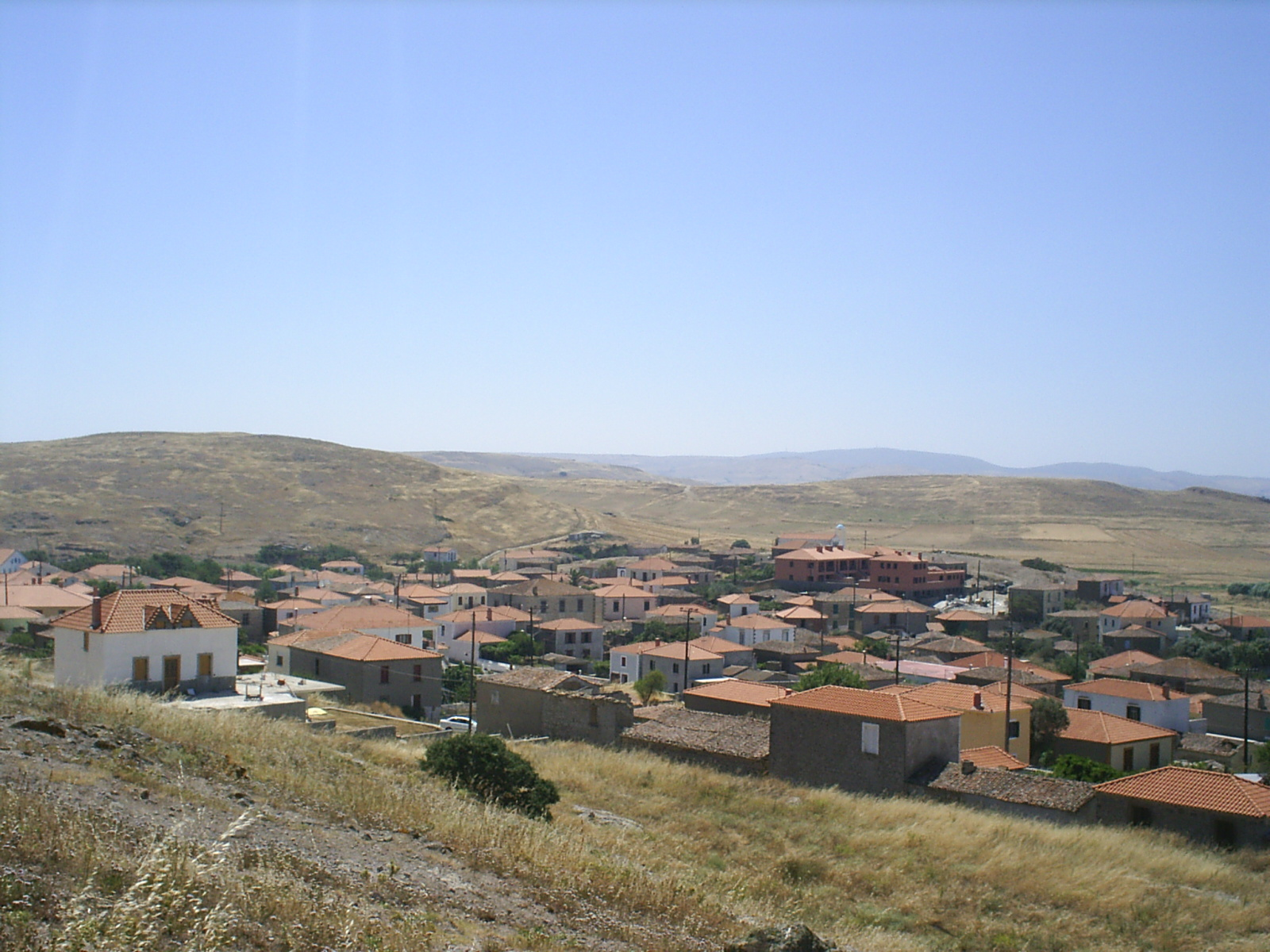
Varos

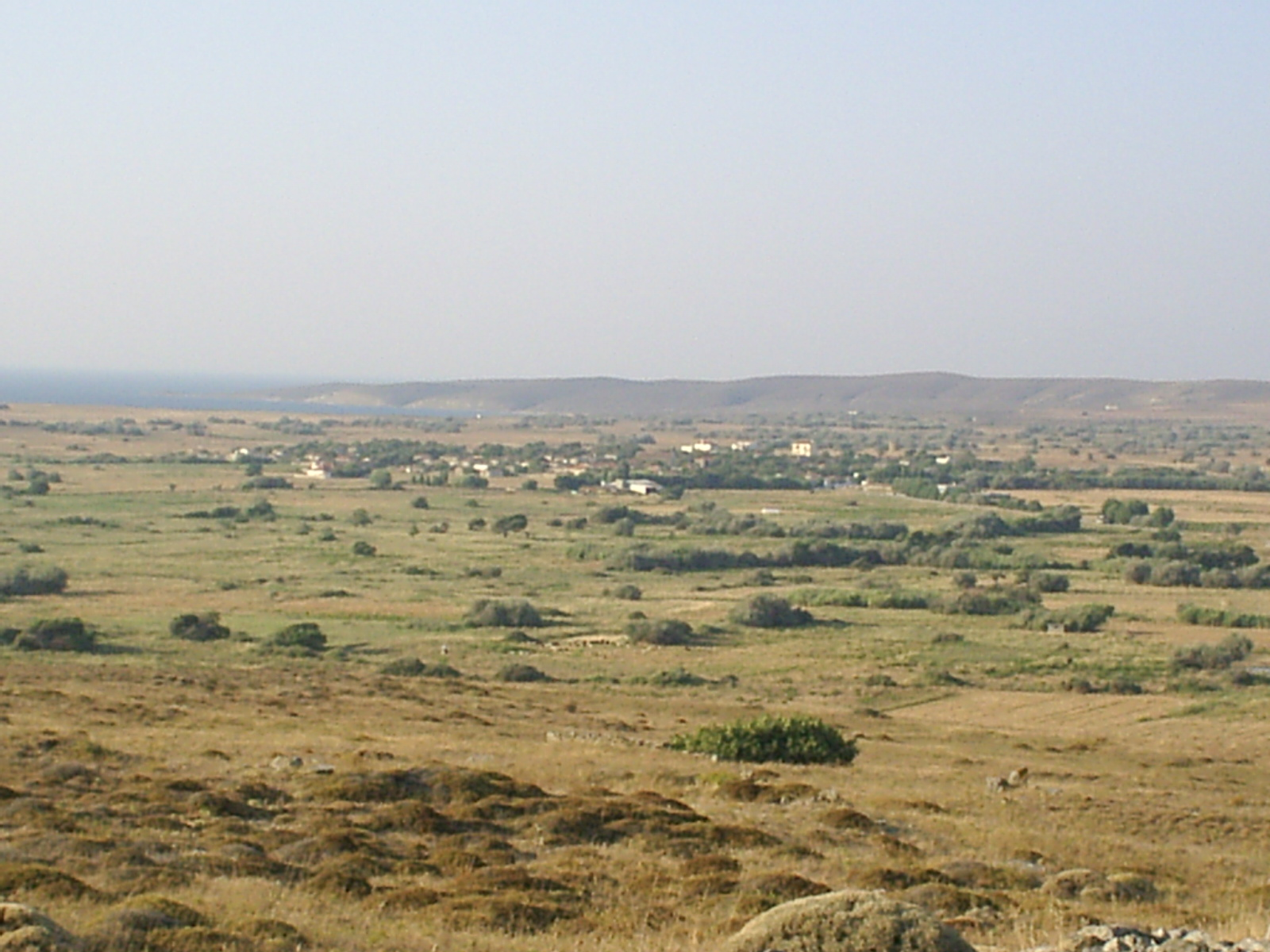
Landscape around Fisini

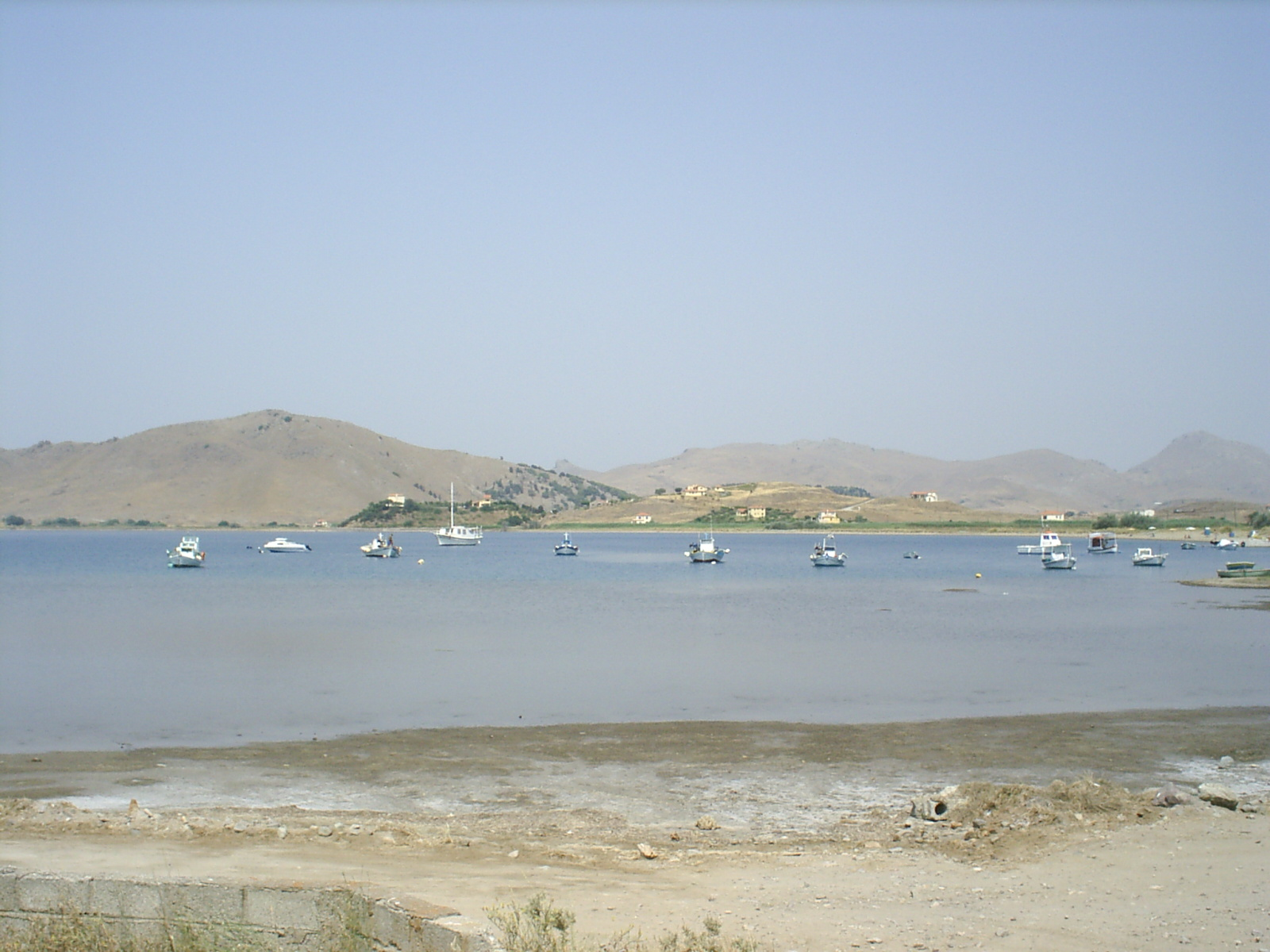
Bay of Diapori

The present municipality of Lemnos was formed on the merger of the following four former municipalities, each of which became municipal units, following the 2011 local government reform:

- Atsiki
- Moudros
- Myrina
- Nea Koutali

Lemnos and the smaller island of Agios Efstratios previously formed part of Lesbos Prefecture. In 2011, the prefecture was abolished and Lemnos and Agios Efstratios now form Lemnos Regional Unit. Lemnos Province, abolished in 2006, comprised the same territory as the present regional unit.

=== Subdivisions ===
The municipal units of Atsiki, Moudros, Myrina and Nea Koutali are subdivided into the following communities (constituent villages in brackets):

Atsiki

- Agios Dimitrios
- Atsiki (Atsiki, Propouli)
- Dafni
- Karpasi
- Katalakko
- Sardes
- Varos (Varos, Aerolimin)

Moudros

- Fisini (Fisini, Agia Sofia)
- Kalliopi
- Kaminia (Kaminia, Voroskopos)
- Kontopouli (Kontopouli, Agios Alexandros, Agios Theodoros)
- Lychna (Lychna, Anemoessa)
- Moudros (Moudros, Koukonisi)
- Panagia (Panagia, Kortisonas)
- Plaka
- Repanidi (Repanidi, Kotsinos)
- Roussopouli
- Romanou
- Skandali

Myrina

- Myrina (Myrina, incl. Androni)
- Thanos (Thanos, Paralia Thanous)
- Kaspakas (Kaspakas, Agios Ioannis, Gali, Limenaria)
- Kornos (Kornos, Psylloi)
- Platy (Platy, Paralia Plateos, Plagisos Molos)

Nea Koutali

- Agkaryones
- Kallithea
- Kontias
- Livadochori (Livadochori, Poliochni)
- Nea Koutali
- Pedino (Neo Pedino, Palaio Pedino, Vounaria)
- Portianou
- Tsimandria

== Culture ==
=== Cuisine ===
Local specialties include:

- Kalathaki Limnou, cheese
- Melichloro, cheese
- Fava (Lathyrus clymenum)
- Paximadia
- Tiganopites
- Flomaria, type of pasta
- Valanes, type of pasta
- Limnio wine
- Katiméria, dessert (tiganites, type of pancakes)
- Feloúdia, dessert

=== Sports ===
- Ifaistos Limnou BC

== Economy ==
Lemnos has a strong husbandry tradition, being famous for the Kalathaki Limnou (PDO), a cheese made from sheep and goat milk; as well as for the Melichloro or Melipasto cheese and its yogurt. Fruit and vegetables that grow on the island include almonds, figs, melons, watermelons, tomatoes, pumpkins and olives. The main crops are wheat, barley, sesame; in fact, Lemnos was Constantinople's granary after the Byzantine Empire lost its Anatolian possessions in the 1320s. Lemnos also produces honey (from thyme-fed bees), but, as is the case with most products of a local nature in Greece, the produced quantities are little more than simply sufficient for the local market. Muscat grapes are grown widely, and are used to produce an unusual table wine that is dry yet has a strong Muscat flavor. Since 1985, the variety and quality of Lemnos wines have increased greatly.

The island's economically active population in 2001 was 6,602. Of them, 12% were employers, 20.5% self-employed, 55.3% wage-earners, 7.1% unpaid, auxiliary family members, and 5.1% did not declare line of occupation. Of the economically active population, 17.9% worked in agriculture, 5.3% in light manufacturing, 11% in construction, 6.7% in hotels and restaurants, and the rest in other lines of business. In 2001, the island had 12,116 regular dwellings, of which 65% were stone-built, and 90.2% had pitched roofs made of red tiles.

In antiquity, the most famous product of Lemnos was its medicinal earth. At one time, it was popular in western Europe under the name terra sigillata. This name was derived from the stamp impressed on each piece of the earth; in ancient times the stamp was the head of Artemis. Turks believed that a vase of this earth destroyed the effect of any poison drunk from it—a belief which the ancients attached rather to the earth from Cape Colias in Attica. Galen went to see the digging up of this earth; on one day in each year a priestess performed the due ceremonies, and a wagon-load of earth was dug out. In more recent times, the day selected was 6 August, the feast of Christ the Saviour. Both the Turkish khawaja and the Greek priest were present to perform the necessary ceremonies; the whole process took place before daybreak. The earth ws sold by apothecaries in stamped cubical blocks. The hill from which the earth is dug is a dry mound, void of vegetation, beside the village of Kotschinos, and about two hours from the site of Hephaestia. The earth was considered in ancient times a cure for old festering wounds, and for the bite of poisonous snakes.

== Transport ==
The only airport is Lemnos International Airport, 18 kilometres (11 mi) east of Myrina. The island is well served by ferries from Piraeus (Athens), Lavrio, and Thessaloniki.

The road network consists of eight numbered provincial roads, created in 1956 while Lemnos was part of the Lesbos Prefecture.

== Notable people ==
- Alcamenes (5th century BC), sculptor
- Maroula of Lemnos (fl. 1478), legendary heroine
- Niyâzî-i Mısrî (1618–1694), Turkish Sufi and poet
- Ioannis Dimitriou (1826–1900), cotton and industrialist merchant
- Peter Charanis(1908–1985), historian
- Komninos Pyromaglou (1899–1980), WWII resistance figure
- Ilias Iliou (1904–1985), politician and leader of United Democratic Left
- Rallis Kopsidis (1929–2010), painter and writer
- Panagiotis Magdanis (b. 1990), Olympic rower

== In popular culture ==
A slightly fictionalized Lemnos appears in the 2013 tactical shooter video game Arma 3 as the island of "Altis", part of the island country of the "Republic of Altis and Stratis". Altis is the main setting of the game, and originally kept the name "Lemnos" before an incident in 2012 between the game's developers and Greek authorities prompted the developers to rename the island. "Stratis", based on Agios Efstratios, is south of the island as it is in real life.

In God of War, at some point in the story Kratos finds a bottle of Lemnian wine, which he claims to come from Lemnos, a place close to where he was born. He eventually shares it with his son Atreus.

== See also ==
- Lemnian language
- Lemniscate
- Limnio wine
- Lemnian Athena
- Armistice of Mudros (or Moudros)

== Sources ==
- Dimitris Plantzos, The Story of Lemnos. Myth - History - Heritage, Athens: Kapon Editions (2022). ISBN 9786182180013
