= Filocalo Navigajoso =

Filocalo Navigajoso (died 1214) was a Venetian (or possibly of mixed Greek and Venetian descent) nobleman and first Latin ruler of the island of Lemnos (known as Stalimene in Italian) in Greece.

Following the Fourth Crusade (1203–1204), most of the Aegean islands were apportioned to the Republic of Venice in the partition of the Byzantine Empire. Various Venetian nobles settled there and claimed the rule of these islands as fief-holders and vassals of the Latin Emperor at Constantinople. Filocalo received the rule of Lemnos and the title, borrowed from Byzantine court titulature, of megadux of the Latin Empire. He ruled the island from the fortress of Kastro or Palaiokastro (modern Myrina) until his death in 1214. Then the island was divided among his heirs. His son, Leonardo Navigajoso, received rule of one-half of the island with Kastro, and his two daughters received one quarter each, with the castles of Moudros and Kotsinos. The family's rule over the island lasted until 1278.

== Sources ==
- Hendrickx, Benjamin (2015). "Les duchés de l'Empire latin de Constantinople après 1204: origine, structures et statuts" [The Duchies of the Latin Empire of Constantinople after 1204. Origin, Structures and Statutes]. Revue belge de philologie et d'histoire (in French). 93 (2): 303–328. doi:10.3406/rbph.2015.8837.
- Saint-Guillain, Guillaume (2001). "Deux îles grecques au temps de l'Empire latin: Andros et Lemnos au XIIIe siècle" [Two Greek Islands at the Time of the Latin Empire: Andros and Lemnos in the 13th Century]. Mélanges de l'École française de Rome: Moyen Âge (in French). 113 (1): 579–620.
- Van Tricht, Filip (2011). The Latin Renovatio of Byzantium: The Empire of Constantinople (1204–1228). Leiden: Brill. ISBN 978-90-04-20323-5.

New creation	Megadux of the Latin Empire and Lord of Lemnos; 1207–1214	Succeeded by Leonardo Navigajoso
