= Leonardo Navigajoso =

Leonardo Navigajoso (died 1260) was a Venetian nobleman and second Latin ruler of the island of Lemnos in Greece.

Leonardo inherited the title of megadux of the Latin Empire and the rule of one-half of Lemnos upon the death of his father, Filocalo Navigajoso, in 1214. His two sisters inherited one-quarter of the island each and passed them on to their sons. Leonardo had three sons, Paolo, who succeeded him, Filippo and Nicolao. All of them died in 1276–1277, when their capital of Kastro was assailed by the Byzantines under Licario. Paolo's widow eventually surrendered Kastro and the rest of the island in 1278.

Preceded by Filocalo Navigajoso	Megadux of the Latin Empire and Lord of Lemnos; 1214–1260	Succeeded by Paolo Navigajoso
