= Pachies Ammoudies of Lemnos =

Large sandy area of Lemnos, Greece

Pachies Ammoudies of Lemnos Sand Dunes of Lemnos
- Sand dunes
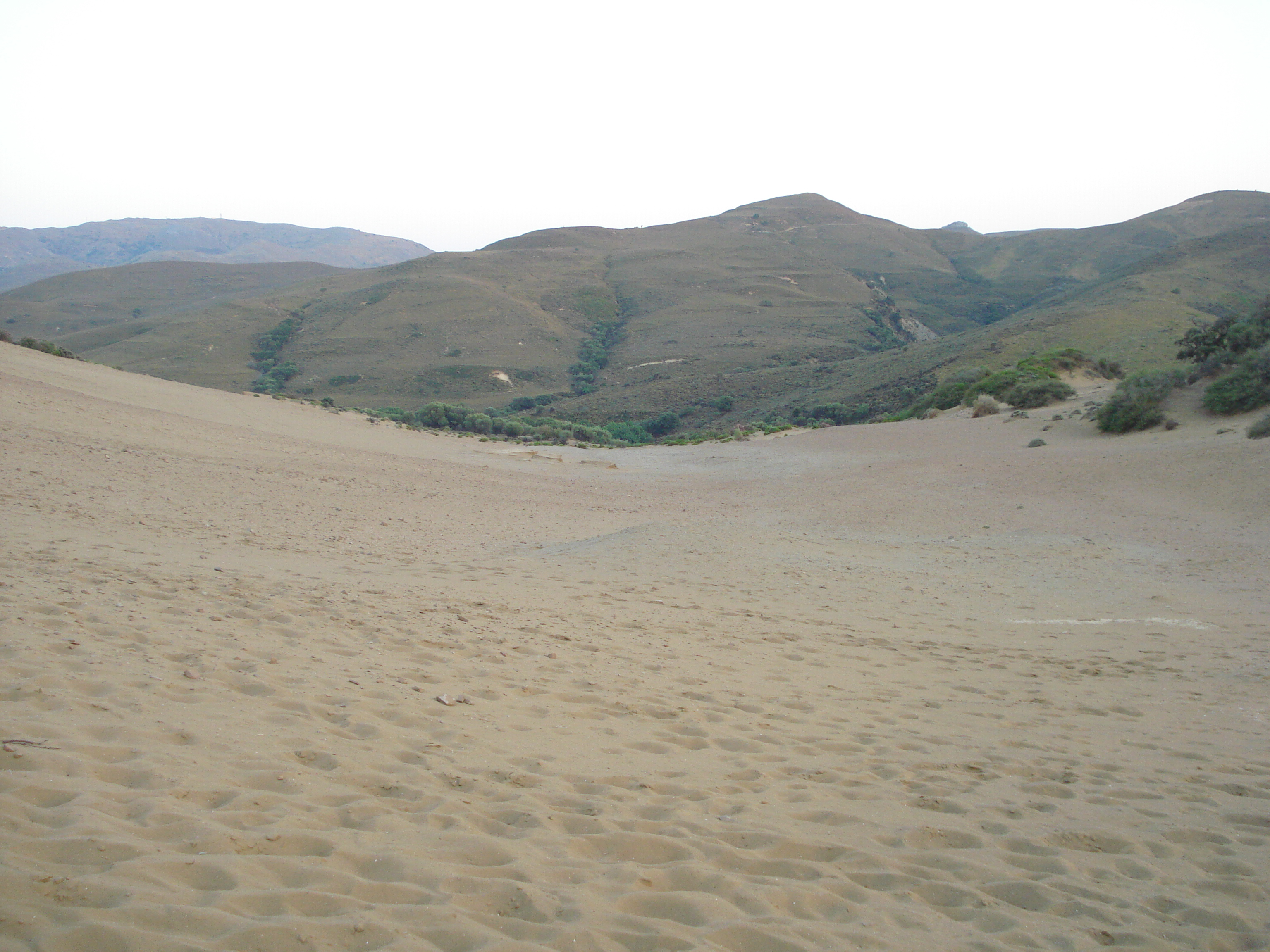

- Location within Greece
- Coordinates: 39°59′N 25°08′E
- Location: Lemnos, Greece

Area
  - Total: 0.3 sq km

Pachies Ammoudies of Lemnos or Sand dunes of Lemnos (Greek: Παχιές Αμμουδιές της Λήμνου or Αμμοθίνες της Λήμνου), also referred to as the Lemnos Desert, are sand dunes on the island of Lemnos in northern Greece. The dunes are spread over an area of about 70 decares (7 hectares). Pachies Ammoudies are located on the north of the island of Lemnos, 3 km north of the village of Katalakkos and near the Gomati beach.

This unexpected landscape testifies the presence of sea in the area during the Paleolithic era.

== Fauna ==
The dunes are home to various animals, most notably rabbits, and also to various species of birds, such as the chukar partridge, the Eurasian hoopoe, the common quail and others.

== Flora ==
The dunes are inhabited by white lilies, sprouting right from the sand and olive trees flanking the edge of the desert, as well as the usual desert shrubbery.
