= North Aegean islands =

Scattered islands in the North Aegean Sea divided between Greece and Turkey

Coordinates: 37.8000°N 23.4500°E

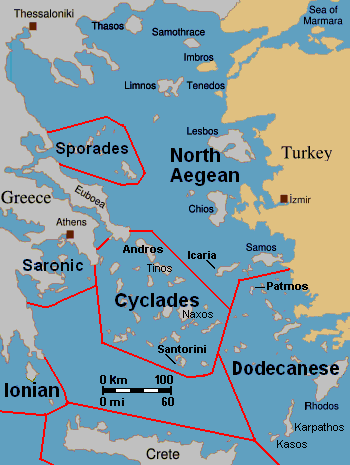
North Aegean islands (center) are not in a physical island chain.

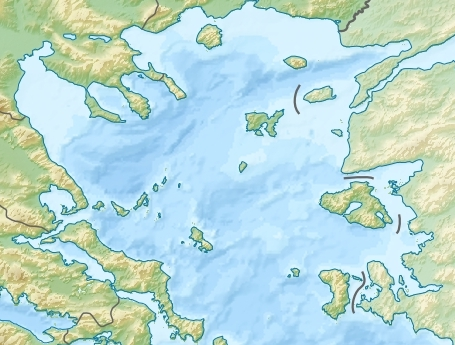
North Aegean Sea map

The North Aegean islands are a number of scattered islands in the North Aegean Sea, also known as the Northeastern Aegean islands, belonging mostly to Greece and a few of them to Turkey. The islands do not form a physical chain or group, but are frequently grouped together for tourist or administrative purposes. To the south are the Dodecanese islands, and to the west are the Cyclades and Sporades islands.

Within this group, the main islands in the northeastern Aegean Sea and along the Turkish coast are the Greek islands of Samos, Ikaria, Chios, Lesbos, Lemnos, Agios Efstratios, Psara, Fournoi Korseon, Oinousses and the Turkish islands of Imbros, Tenedos and the Rabbit or Tavşan Islands. The main islands in the Thracian Sea in the far north are the Greek islands of Samothrace and Thasos.

Most are in the North Aegean administrative region.

== History ==
From the Mesolithic Age, the North Aegean, as indeed the entire Aegean, ceased to be an obstacle and became a bridge joining the inhabitants of the region. Shipping, trade, economy, culture and social interactions developed in the archipelago and surrounding areas on the basis of communication and contact between the inhabitants. This was especially true after the permanent settlement of the islands around 5000 BC.

The islands of the north Aegean were in such a position that shipping and trade contributed greatly to the development of a significant culture. The culture reached its peak around 3000 BC. The growth of settlements such as Poliochnis in Lemnos, Emporiou in Chios and Heraion of Samos, amongst others, are evidence of the importance of these centers at this time.

By around 2000 BC, the Ionians had installed themselves in Chios, while Samos and Lesbos were in the hands of the Achaeans. In the late 12th and early 11th centuries BC, a time when vast numbers of the people moved to Greece, the Aeolians arrived in Lesbos.

From the 8th to the 5th century BC, the islands enjoyed great prosperity in their economy, trade and the arts. The islands were conquered by the Persians in the Greco-Persian Wars in the 5th century BC. After their release in 468 BC, they made an alliance with Athens. However, during the Peloponnesian War (429–404 BC) their allegiance swayed between Athens and Sparta. In 338 BC, the Macedonians came into power followed by Ptolemaic Egypt. After this period, the islands suffered the same fate as the rest of Greece, coming under the rule of the Roman Empire. During the early Byzantine era, there was calm in the North Aegean, but from the 7th century on, this was disrupted by Arab raids.

After the conquest of Constantinople by the Franks in 1204, the islands found themselves shared amongst the Venetians, Genoese and "Frankish" princes (Frankokratia). Under this rule, shipping and trade flourished. The fall of Constantinople in 1453 and the founding of the Ottoman Empire resulted in a period of destruction, plundering and persecution for the islands. The occupation also led to the decline of the Christian population. In the early 16th century, the islands began to enjoy a period of prosperity.

The inhabitants of the islands were actively involved in the Greek War of Independence, and the emergence of leaders in the struggle, such as Lykourgos Logothetis, Konstantinos Kanaris and Dimitrios Papanikolis, brought about reprisals from the Turkish authorities. The massacres of Chios in 1822 and Psara in 1824 brought attention from European powers, which helped the Greek cause.

However, due to their position, close to the Anatolian coast, the Turks did not let go of their hold on the islands easily. It was not until 1912, when the islands of the north Aegean were finally incorporated into the Greek state, during the First Balkan War.

== See also ==
- Greek North Aegean islands
- Turkish Aegean Sea islands
