= Archaeological Museum of Chios =

Museum in Greece

Coordinates: 38.3652°N 26.1393°E

The Archaeological Museum of Chios is a museum located on Michalon Street in Chios town, Chios, Greece. Designed by the Greek architects Souzána Antonakáki and Dimitris Antonakakis & Eleni Gousi-Desylla in 1965, it has been widely regarded as a significant building in the architectural history of modern Greece. Constructed in 1966-1971, it covers a total area of 2500 square metres. 1200 square metres of floor space is occupied by the exhibitions.

The museum underwent renovation in 1998 and reopened in November 1999 and features a collection of antiquities from the Neolithic Era up to the Roman times excavated at the ancient sites of Emporio (Ο Εμπορειός), Kato Fana (Τα Κάτω Φανά), Dotia (Τα Δότια), Aghio Galas (Άγιο Γάλα) and at Chios town. Many of the artifacts unearthed at the sites were dug by the British School of Archaeology.

The periodical exhibition is housed on the third floor and is named “Psara in Antiquity”. It contains artifacts such as vases, gold jewelry, terracotta figurines and funeral gift items. The Psara collection was found at the Mycenaean Necropolis of Archontiki on Psara Island.
