= Emporio, Chios =

Prehistoric settlement in Chios, Mastichochoria, Greece

Coordinates: 38°11′38″N 26°01′46″E

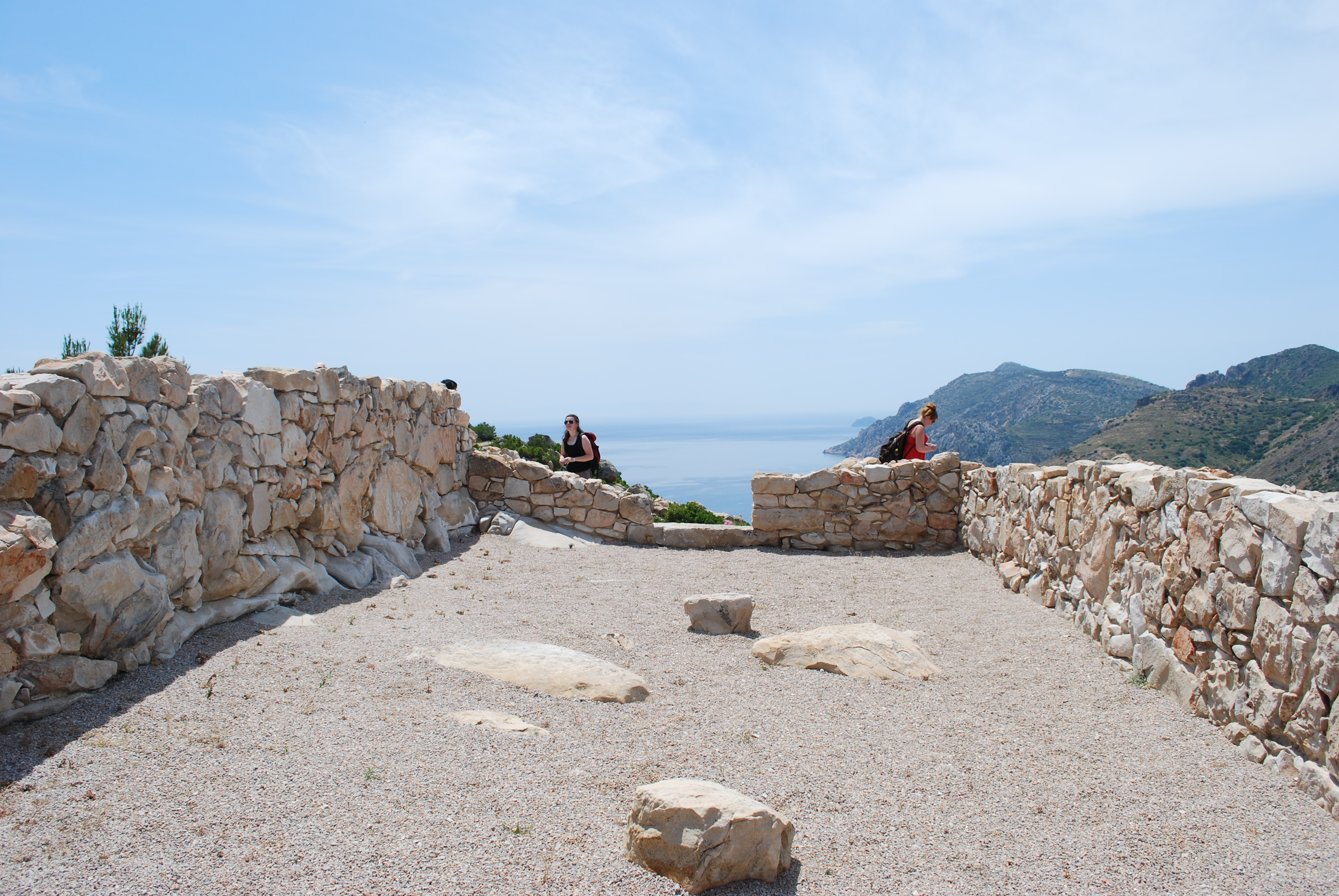
Archaeological site of Emporio in Chios

Emporio is a prehistoric settlement in the southeastern part of the island of Chios in the Mastichochoria municipality of Greece. Pyrgi is the largest village nearby. It was inhabited since the early Neolithic times, around 6000 BC. The fertile valley with drinking water, a natural harbor nearby and the associated access to the sea were favorable conditions for settlement.

The modern village nearby is called Emborios. It is a coastal town with 47 inhabitants (2011).

== Archaeology ==
Sinclair Hood started his work on Chios for the British School at Athens in 1952. He noted the ruins of Emporio in the same year, and his excavations continued to 1955.

A fortified settlement was founded on the peninsula south of Emborios Bay at the end of the Chalcolithic. At the same time, another settlement developed near the beach outside the fortress, which lasted until the final phase of the Mycenaean culture (ca. 1100 BC).

The settlement flourished during the Copper and Bronze Age in the 3rd and 2nd millennium BC.

=== Comparative chronology ===
According to recent research, the earliest Period I at Emporio coincided with the Early Helladic EH IIB at Argolis, Early Minoan EM IIB in Crete, Period II at Miletus, Period V at Koukonisi, the Yellow period at Poliochne, and Period IIg-III at Troy.

== Antiquity ==
Around 1100 BC, the settlement was abandoned; indications are that it was destroyed by fire. This period coincides with the beginning of Ionian colonization around 1050 BC. For the next century, the Ionians of Attica and Euboea reached the islands such as Chios and Samos, and the coast of Asia Minor. The Ionian settlement of Lefkonio (or Lefkonion) developed in the area.

== Lefkonio ==
The settlement of Lefkonio was an archaic-period settlement that included a walled acropolis with a megaron and the Temple of Athena, the remains of both of which are visible on the hill of Prophet Elias, as it is known locally. There were also the houses around it, as well as a sanctuary close to the harbor. The acropolis was fortified, and the rampart around it enclosed an area of approximately 25,000 square metres (270,000 sq ft). The rampart is still partly visible in some areas.

There was a continuous settlement at the site up to the 7th century AD of the Byzantine period.

Kato Phana is another ancient site nearby in southwestern Chios.

== See also ==
- Grotta-Pelos culture
- Archaeological Museum of Chios

== Bibliography ==
- Kristina Jarošová 2018, Late Bronze Age Settlement History of Emporio on Chios Reconsidered. STUDIA HERCYNIA
- K Jarošová 2017, The Late Bronze Age Pottery Sequence from Emporio on Chios Reconsidered. (short version) - academia.edu
- Hood, S. 1982: Prehistoric Emporio and Ayio Gala. Excavations in Chios 1938–1955, Vol. II. BSA, Suppl. Vol. 16. London.
- Girella, L. – Pavúk, P. 2015: Minoanisation, Acculturation, Hybridisation:the Evidence of the Minoan Presence in the North East Aegean between the Middle and Late Bronze Age. In: N. Stampolidis – Ç. Maner,. – K. Kopanias (eds.): NOSTOI. Indigenous Culture, Migration and Integration in the Aegean Islands and Western Anatolia during the Late Bronze and Early Iron Age. Istanbul, 387–420.
- Girella, L. – Pavúk, P. 2016: The Nature of Minoan and Mycenaean Involvement in the Northeastern Aegean. In: E. Gorogianni – P. Pavúk – L. Girella (eds.): Beyond Thalassocracies. Understanding processes of Minoanisation and Mycenaeanisation in the Aegean. Oxford/Philadelphia, 15–42.
- Jarošová, K. 2016: Keramika střední a pozdní doby bronzové z lokality Emporio na ostrově Chios (Middle and Late Bronze Age Pottery from Emporio on Chios), M.A. Thesis, Charles University in Prague, Faculty of Arts, Institute of Classical Archaeology, Prague.
- Mountjoy, P. A. 1999: Regional Mycenaean Decorated Pottery. Rahden/Westf.
- Pavúk, P. 2010: Minyan or not. The second millennium Grey Ware in western Anatolia and its relation to Mainland Greece. In: A. Philippa–Touchais et al. (eds.): MESOHELLADIKA. The Greek Mainland in the Middle Bronze Age. BCH Suppl.52. Athens, 931–943.
