= Depas Amphikypellon =

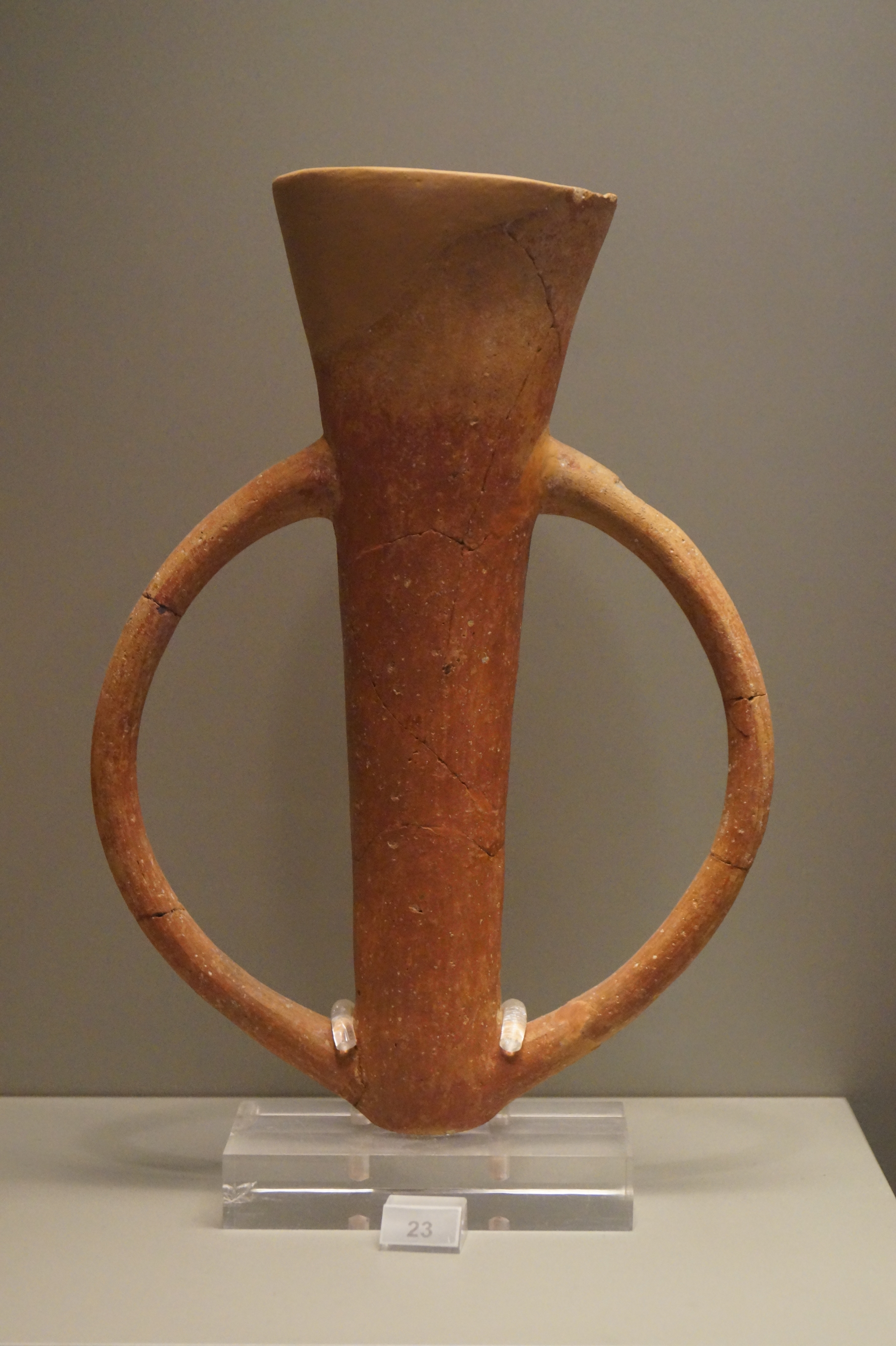
Depas Amphikypellon from Poliochni on Lemnos, Early Bronze Age (3rd millennium BC). National Archaeological Museum of Athens

Depas Amphikypellon (Ancient Greek: δέπας ἀμφικύπελλον; plural depata) is a distinctive Bronze Age drinking cup. Typically it is a tall, narrow beaker with a round base and two large handles opposite each other. These vessels are widely distributed from the Greek mainland to northern Syria and as far as Euphrates. They are especially common in the extensive areas of Anatolia.

The Greek name now applied to them was first used by Homer to describe the cup of Priam, king of Troy, which he had received from the Thracians. Heinrich Schliemann wrongly thought that he had excavated such a vessel at Troy. The designation of this type of vessels with the ancient name Depas Amphikypellon is still internationally common today. Alternatively, these vessels are also referred to as Trojabecher or becher.

== References in Homer ==
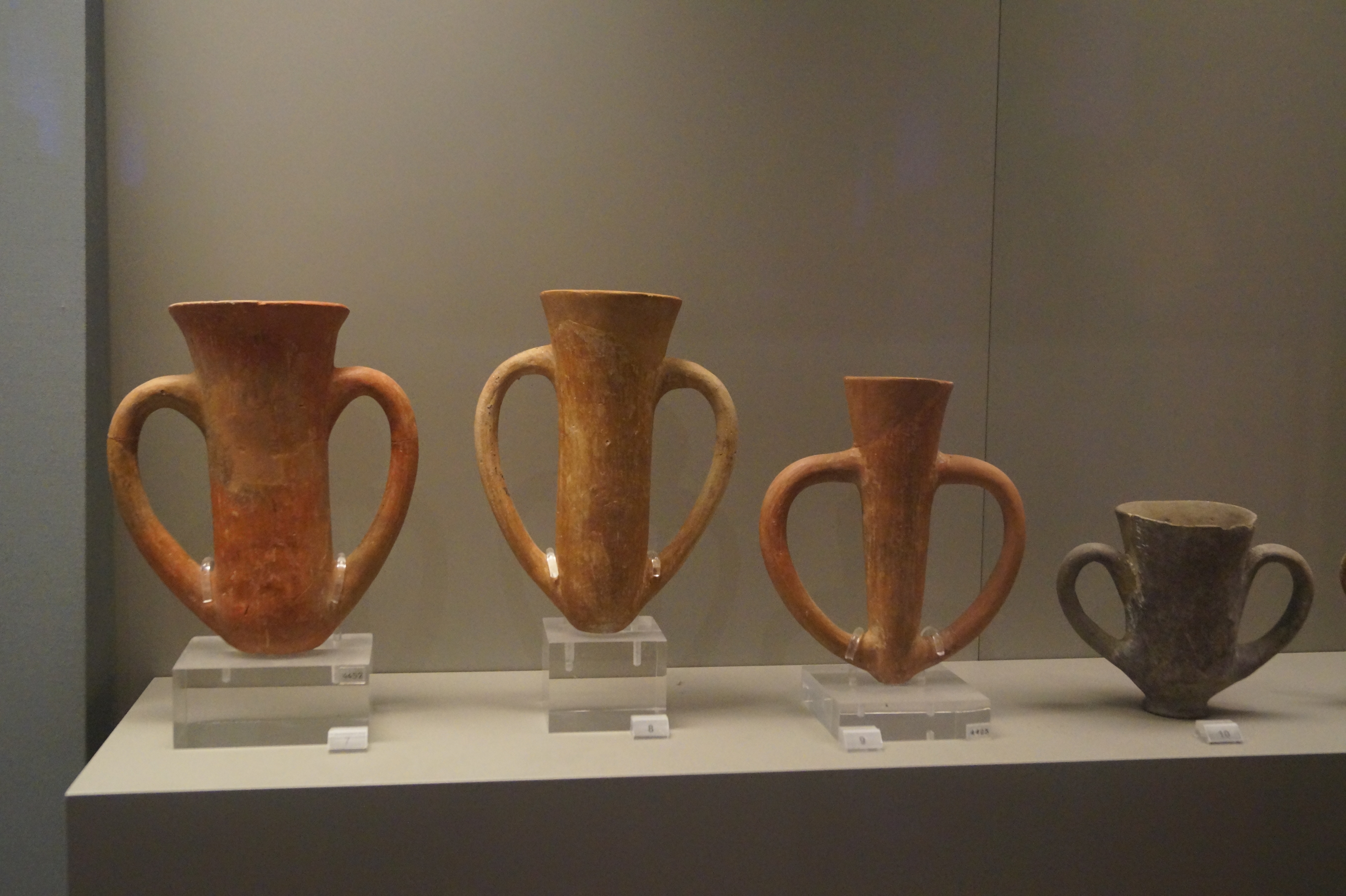
Depata Amphikypellon from Troy II (3rd millennium BC)

In the first book of the Iliad, Homer describes how the god Hephaestus scoops nectar potion with a Depas Amphikypellon and gives it to his mother Hera and the other Olympian gods to appease them. In the sixth book, Oeneus gives Bellerophont a golden Depas Amphikypellon as a gift. Achilles is also described as offering wine from a golden Depas as a libation to the fallen Patroclus.

== Description ==
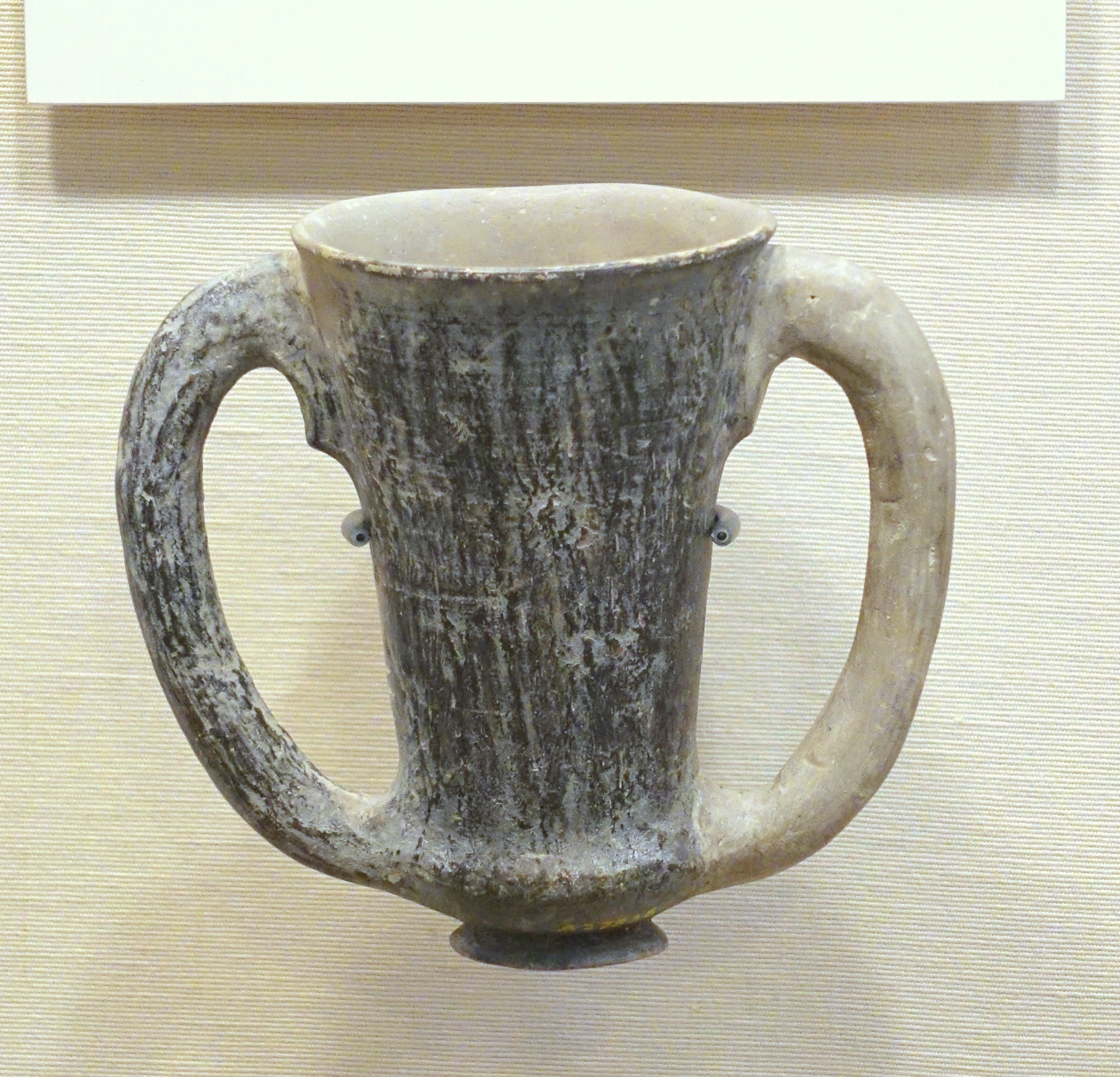
Depas Amphikypellon from Tell Tayinat (Southeast Turkey, 2200–2000 BC)

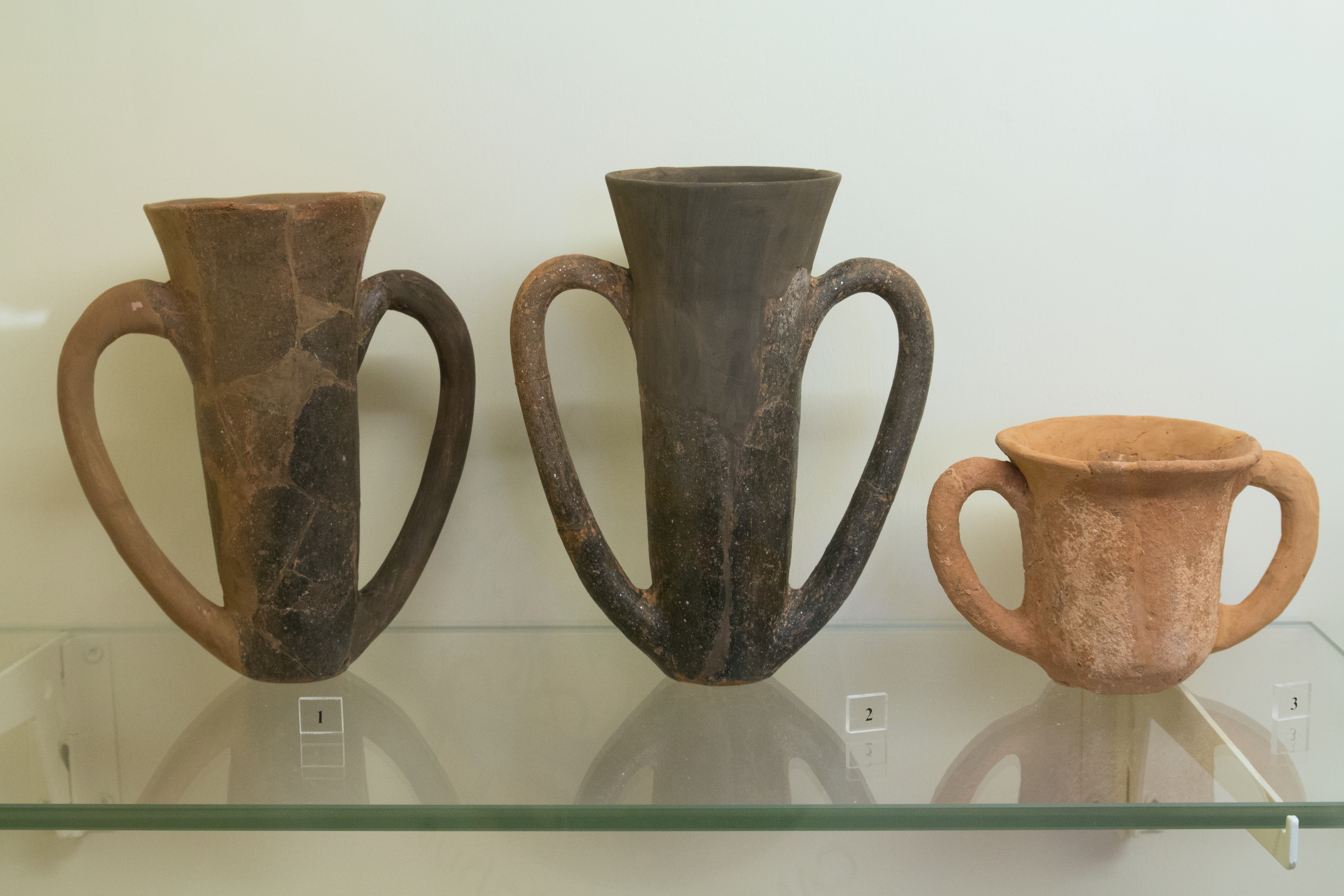
Depata Amphikypellon from Kastri on the island of Syros (3rd millennium BC)

The basic form of these vessels consists of a tall, narrow beaker with a round base and two large handles opposite each other, which are attached close to the base of the vessel, and close to the edge of the vessel. There are hand-made and wheel-made specimens. Some are tapered at the bottom and others have a flat base.

The detailed specifications and finding contexts of the depata in Anatolia, along with typological considerations, are provided recently in a work by Bilgen (2015).

Possible uses of Depas in Bronze Age Anatolia, and the types of drinks that were consumed from them, were investigated by Murat Türkteki. Organic residues in the ancient depas were analyzed. They indicated the consumption of fermented products such as wine and herbal analgesics.

== Distribution ==
Depas Amphikypellons are considered to be indicative of the third phase of the Early Bronze Age in the eastern Mediterranean (about 2300-2000 BC). Such vessels were found in northern Syria, south-eastern, central and western Anatolia, on the Aegean Islands, in Greece and in Bulgaria.

Derya Yilmaz (2021) provides good maps of distribution of this and similar Early Bronze Age vessels from the Balkans to Greece and Anatolia and beyond.

They are an indication of the trade and cultural exchange of the time. It is not yet known where the homeland of the Depas Amphikypellon is. The great variety of forms can be explained by the fact that many of the vessels found were not imported, but came from local production.

A silver Depas Amphikypellon was discovered at Troy. It was found in the Early Bronze Age level II, and was dated to around 2300 BC. It is 6 in. (15 cm.) wide and 3½ in. (9 cm.) high, including handles.

== See also ==
- Minoan pottery

== Bibliography ==
- ŞAHOĞLU, V. 2014. “The depas and Tankard Vessels”, Associated Regional Chronologies for the Ancient Near East and Eastern Mediterranean (ARCANE) Interregional Vol. I: Ceramics (Ed. M. Lebeau). Brepols: 289-311
- SAHOGLU, VASIF (2005). "The Anatolian Trade Network and the Izmir Region During the Early Bronze Age". Oxford Journal of Archaeology. 24 (4). Wiley: 339–361. doi:10.1111/j.1468-0092.2005.00240.x. ISSN 0262-5253.
- BİLGEN, A.N./KURU, A. 2015. “A Group of Depas Amphikypellon from Seyitömer Mound”, Anadolu Anatolia 41: 1-23
- LESHTAKOV, K. P. 2014. “Troy and Upper Thrace: What Happened in EBA 3? (Interrelations Based on Pottery Evidence)”, Early Bronze Age Troy: Chronological, Cultural Development, and Interregional Contacts. An International Conference held at the University of Tübingen May 8-10, 20109 (Studia Troica Monohraghien 8) (Ed. E. Pernicka/S. Ünlüsoy/S. W. Blum). Bonn: 321-337
- TURKER, ATILLA (2018-12-30). "SULUCA KARAHÖYÜK: A COMMERCIAL CONTEXT IN CENTRAL CAPPADOCIA IN LIGHT OF DEPAS AMPHIKYPELLON FINDINGS AND A FOOT-SHAPED STAMP SEAL". Türkiye Bilimler Akademisi Arkeoloji Dergisi. 23 (1). Parantez Teknologji Ltd: 54–65. doi:10.22520/tubaar.2018.23.003 (inactive 11 July 2025). ISSN 1301-8566. S2CID 239268934.
- Manfred Korfmann: Troia: Archäologie eines Siedlungshügels und seiner Landschaft, Philipp von Zabern, Mainz 2006, ISBN 3805335091, p. 205
- Lorenz Rahmstorf: Zur Ausbreitung vorderasiatischer Innovationen in die frühbronzezeitliche Ägäis. In: Prähistorische Zeitschrift. Band 81, 2006, p. 49–96, hier S. 52–55 ()
- Peter Z. Spanos: Untersuchung über den bei Homer „depas amphikypellon“ genannten Gefäßtypus (= Istanbuler Mitteilungen. Beiheft 6). Wasmuth, Tübingen 1972.
