= Koukonesi =

Greek island in the Aegean Sea

Koukonesi Κουκονήσι
- Community
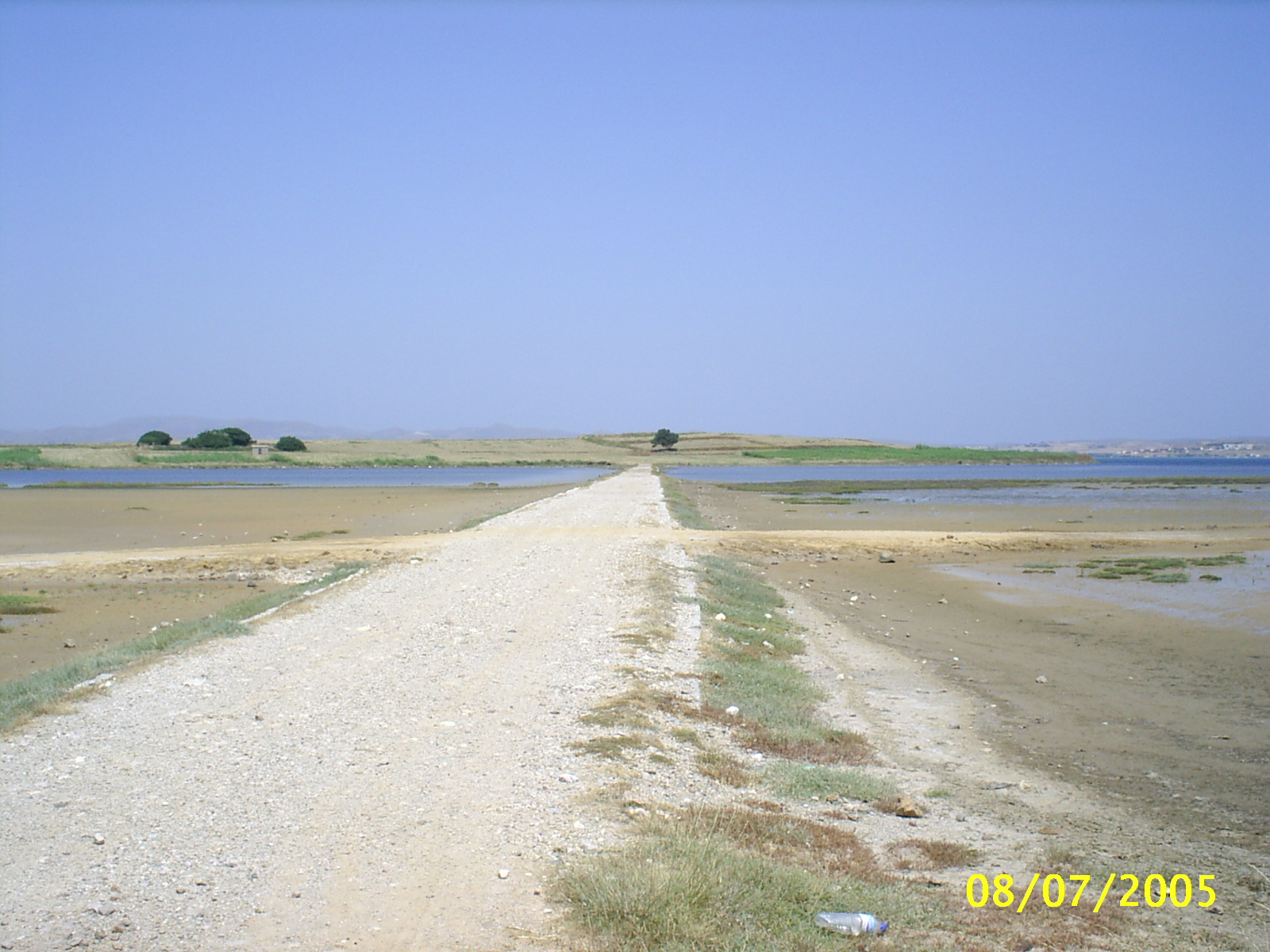
- An image of Lemnos from 2005.

- Location within Greece
- Coordinates: 39.886°N 25.269°E
- Country: Greece
- Administrative region: North Aegean
- Regional unit: Lemnos
- Municipality: Lemnos
- Municipal unit: Moudros
- Time zone: UTC+2 (EET)
  - Summer (DST): UTC+3 (EEST)

Koukonesi (Κουκονήσι) is a small island, situated in the Moudros harbour, west of Poliochne, on the island of Lemnos in the Aegean Sea. The island is an important archaeological site. The best preserved settlements found on Koukonesi are from the Middle Bronze Age, 2000 BC—1650 BC. The findings have shown that Koukonesi's inhabitants had close commercial relations with Asia Minor, other Aegean Sea islands and mainland Greece. Greek archaeologists also discovered Mycenaean ceramics of the late 13th century BC which may prove that a permanent settlement was established around the epoch of the Trojan War.
