= Souzana Antonakaki =

Greek architect (1935–2020)

Suzana Antonakaki
- Born: Souzana Maria Kolokytha; 25 June 1935; Athens, Greece
- Died: 5 July 2020 (aged 85); Athens, Greece
- Occupation: Architect

Suzana Antonakaki (Greek: Σουζάνα Αντωνακάκη; 25 June 1935 – 5 July 2020) was a Greek architect.

Souzana (often written as Suzana in English) Maria Kolokytha was born in 1935 in Athens and studied at the School of Architecture of the National Technical University of Athens from 1954 to 1959. She and her husband, Dimitris Antonakakis (born 22 December 1933), along with Eleni Gousi-Desylla, founded Atelier 66 in 1965 in Athens, often associated with the architectural movement called "critical regionalism". She was a member of the French Academy of Architecture (Academie d 'Architecture) and the National Secretariat of the UIA. Antonakaki was invited by Herman Hertzberger to teach at the 1987 International Design Seminar of TU Delft's School of Architecture and at the University of Split in 1988.

Suzana Maria Antonakaki died on 5 July 2020, in Athens, aged 85.
