= Poliochne =

Archaeological site on Lemnos island, Greece

- Poliochni
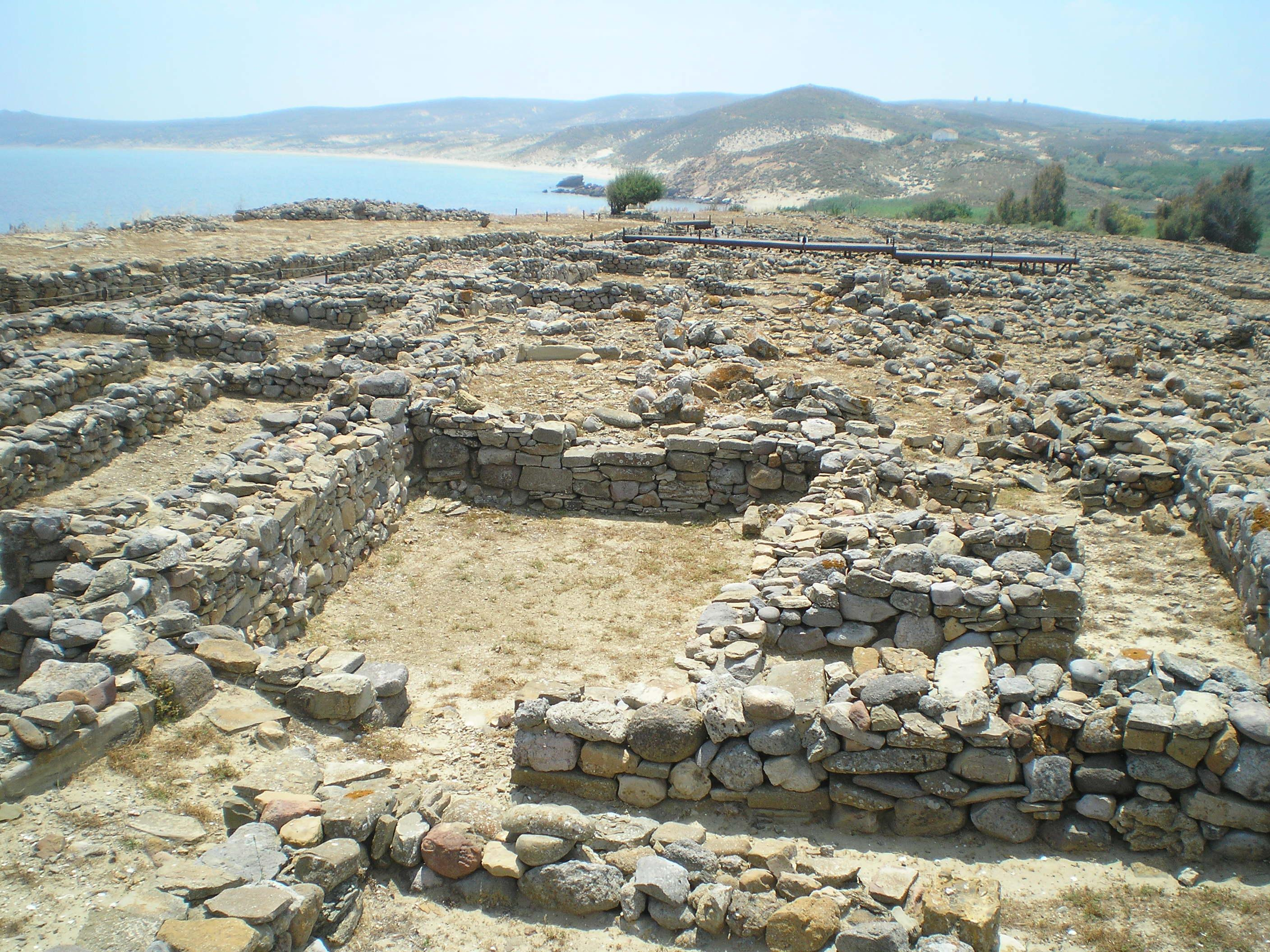
- Remains of building walls at Poliochne

- Location within Greece
- 39°51′15″N 25°20′37″E
- Type: Settlement
- Location: Poliochni, Lemnos, Greece

Site notes
- Management: 20th Ephorate of Prehistoric and Classical Antiquities
- Public access: Yes
- Website: Archaeological Site of Poliochni

Poliochne, often cited under its modern name Poliochni (Greek: Πολιόχνη), was an ancient settlement on the east coast of the island of Lemnos. It was settled in the Late Chalcolithic and earliest Aegean Bronze Age and is believed to be one of the most ancient towns in Europe, preceding Troy I. Anatolian features of the earliest layers were affected by cultural influences from Helladic Greece, about the start of Early Helladic II, ca. 2500 BC.

The site, with houses huddled together sharing party walls, was unearthed by excavations of the Italian School of Archaeology at Athens (Scuola archeologica Italiana di Athene), beginning in 1930. It is believed that Troy was its main rival commercially; a rivalry that led to the decline of Poliochne circa 2000 BC.

== Archaeology ==
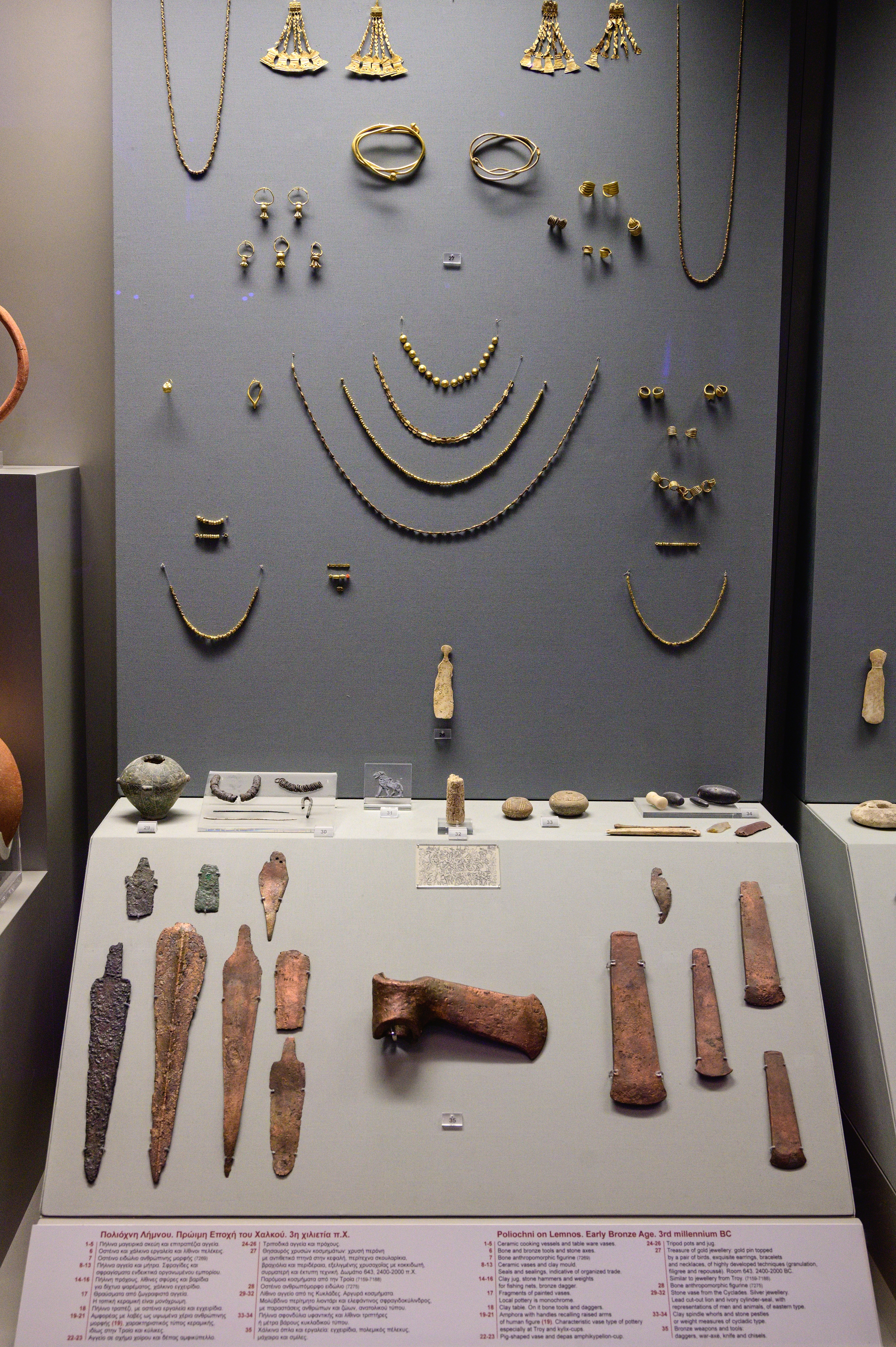
Bronze Age finds from Poliochne, 3rd millennium BC, including gold jewellery from 2400-2000 BC

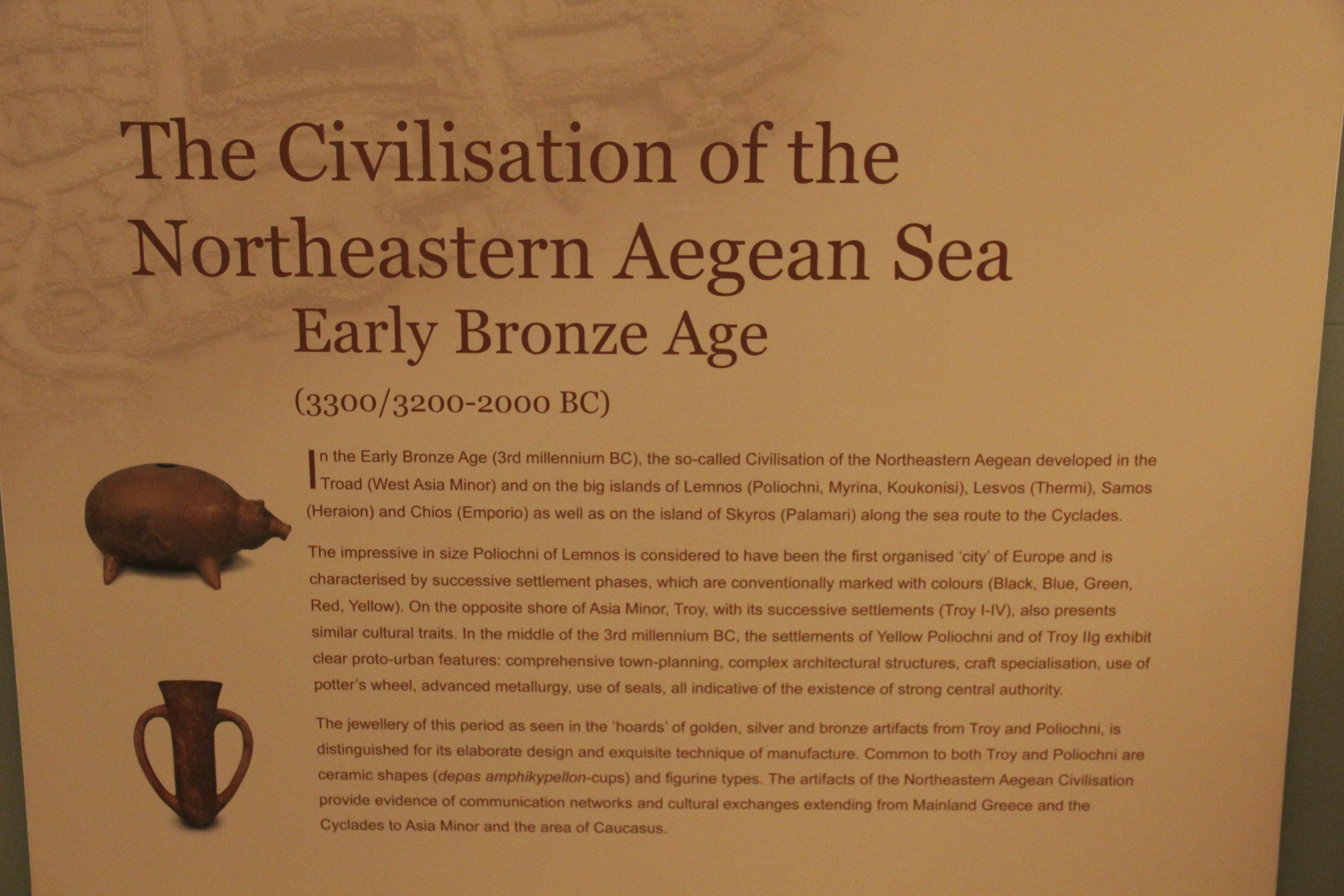
Greek Prehistory Gallery, National Archaeological Museum, Athens, Greece

Following initial soundings, regular campaigns at Poliochne were undertaken under A. Della Seta (it) in 1931-36, when they were suspended. Following Della Seta's death, excavations were resumed in 1951-53, 1956 and 1960.

During 1994-1997, Greek archaeologists discovered a more recent Bronze Age settlement on the tiny uninhabited island of Koukonesi situated in the Moudros harbour, west of Poliochne. This settlement was developed circa 2000-1650 BC, and the findings again prove commercial ties with Asia Minor, and with Aegean islands and mainland Greece. Mycenaean ceramics of the 13th century BC found on Koukonesi could prove that, around when the traditional era of the Trojan War took place, the Greeks had a permanent settlement there, rather than just a commercial outpost, understanding the importance of the straits connecting the Aegean and the Black Sea.

== Periodisation ==
From 1951 the site was excavated under the direction of Luigi Bernabò Brea. He clarified the stratigraphy by assigning colors to different phases of the settlement. There are seven numbered phases altogether, and the names are given here in Italian, as well as English. Black/Nero (I), Blue/Azzurro (II), Green/Verde (III), Red/Rosso (IV), Yellow/Giallo (V), Brown/Bruno (VI), and Mycenaean (VII).

=== Black Period ===
This period corresponds to the Early Bronze I period in the Aegean. It has 7 different levels of construction, thus testifying to a long and continuous occupation over a long period. The villages during this phase consist of huts that are generally round or oval in shape with stone bases.

For this period, the site has only been excavated under megaron 605 and megaron 832. Under megaron 832, excavations have shown 7 consecutive layers over 2 meters in depth. Under the megaron 605, only 3 levels are visible.

As for the ceramics, it has painted decorations, white in color, with linear patterns. There are some similarities to the Eutresis culture ceramics.

Myrina, also on Lemnos, and Koukonesi (very close by), have also been excavated recently. Myrina is considered contemporary with Poliochni Black period.

=== Blue Period ===
It follows the black period, and we notice during this period an enlargement of the city with the construction of a defensive wall. There's also the construction of a typically Cretan megaron, testifying to an exchange between Crete and the city of Poliochni.

This period, like the previous one, has 7 construction phases. Now is the first appearance of metal items. The finds include pins, awls, and a dagger. A mould for a shaft-hole axe has also been found, which indicates local casting of various tools. Stamp seals also appear at this period. This phase may correspond to early Troy I (Renfrew), or to the Troy I/II transition (Podzuweit).

=== Green period ===
This is the shortest period of the site, but it may be associated with Troy I or II, through ceramics. It has only 3 architectural phases.

=== Red period ===
This period has 4 to 8 different architectural phases. A hoard of bronze items was found from this period that includes a shaft-hole axe, daggers and other tools and weapons.

=== Yellow period ===
The yellow period features a large fortified town. Houses are constructed as large multi-roomed blocks with megaron units at the core. These architectural ensembles are quite different in detail from the corresponding architecture of Troy I-II, or Thermi III-V. Similar to Troy IIg, a lot of gold jewellery was found. An imported cylinder seal was also found. This phase was contemporary with late Troy II, and Troy III. There may also be some correspondences with Troy IV.

A gap in occupation has been detected after the Yellow period.

=== Brown period ===
Poliochni is resettled during the Brown period, which may be contemporary with Troy V.

== Gallery ==
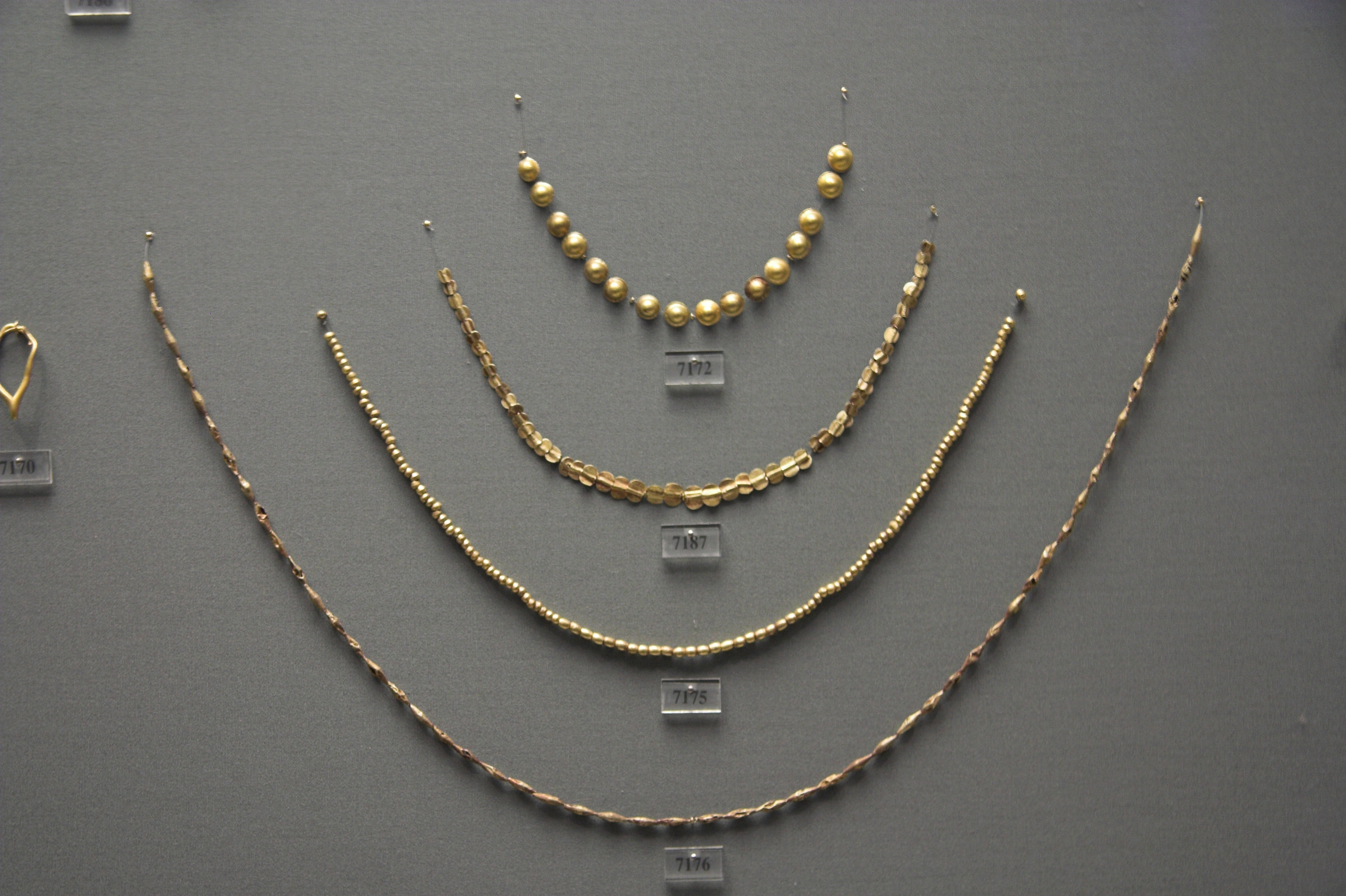

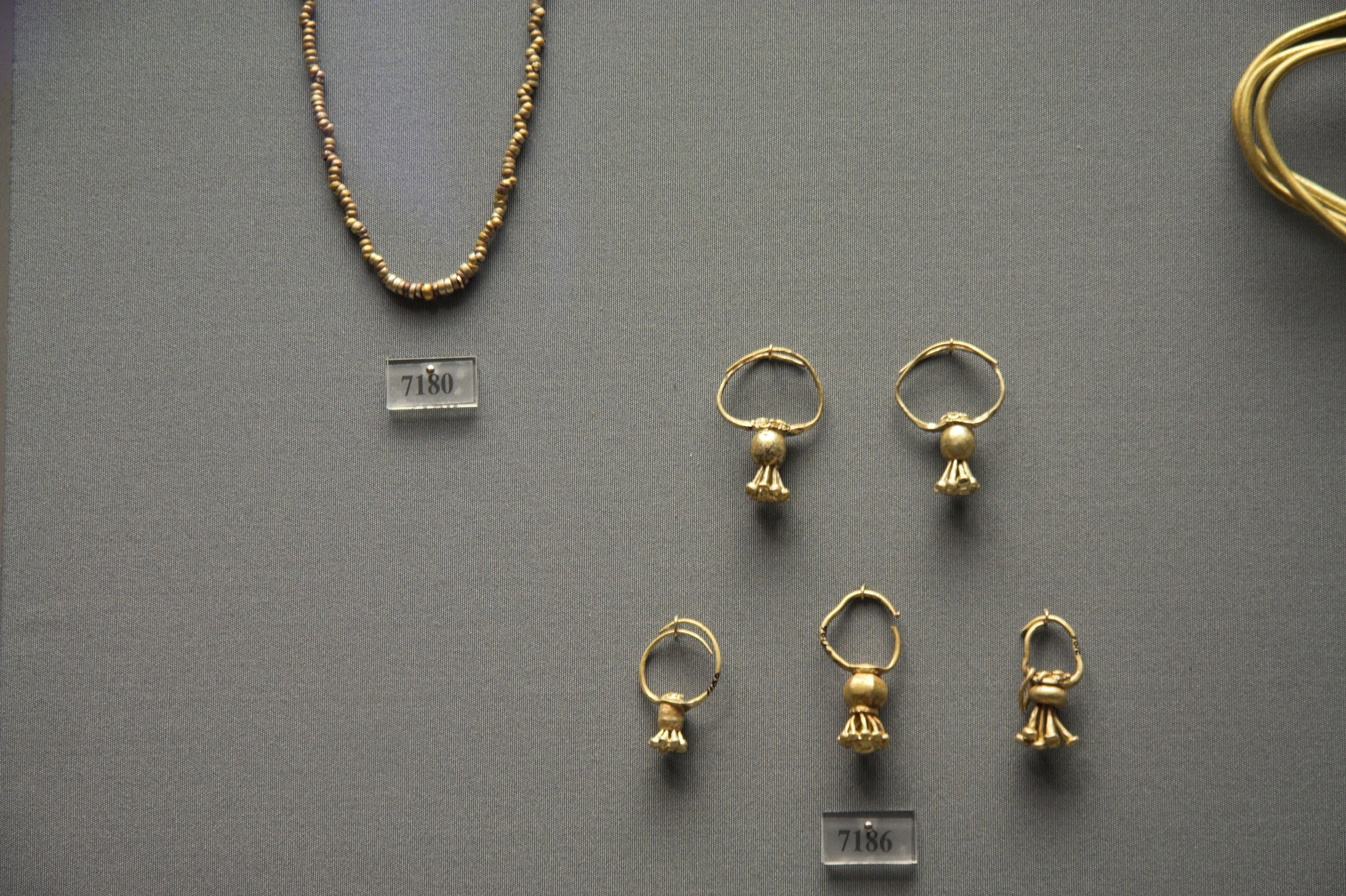

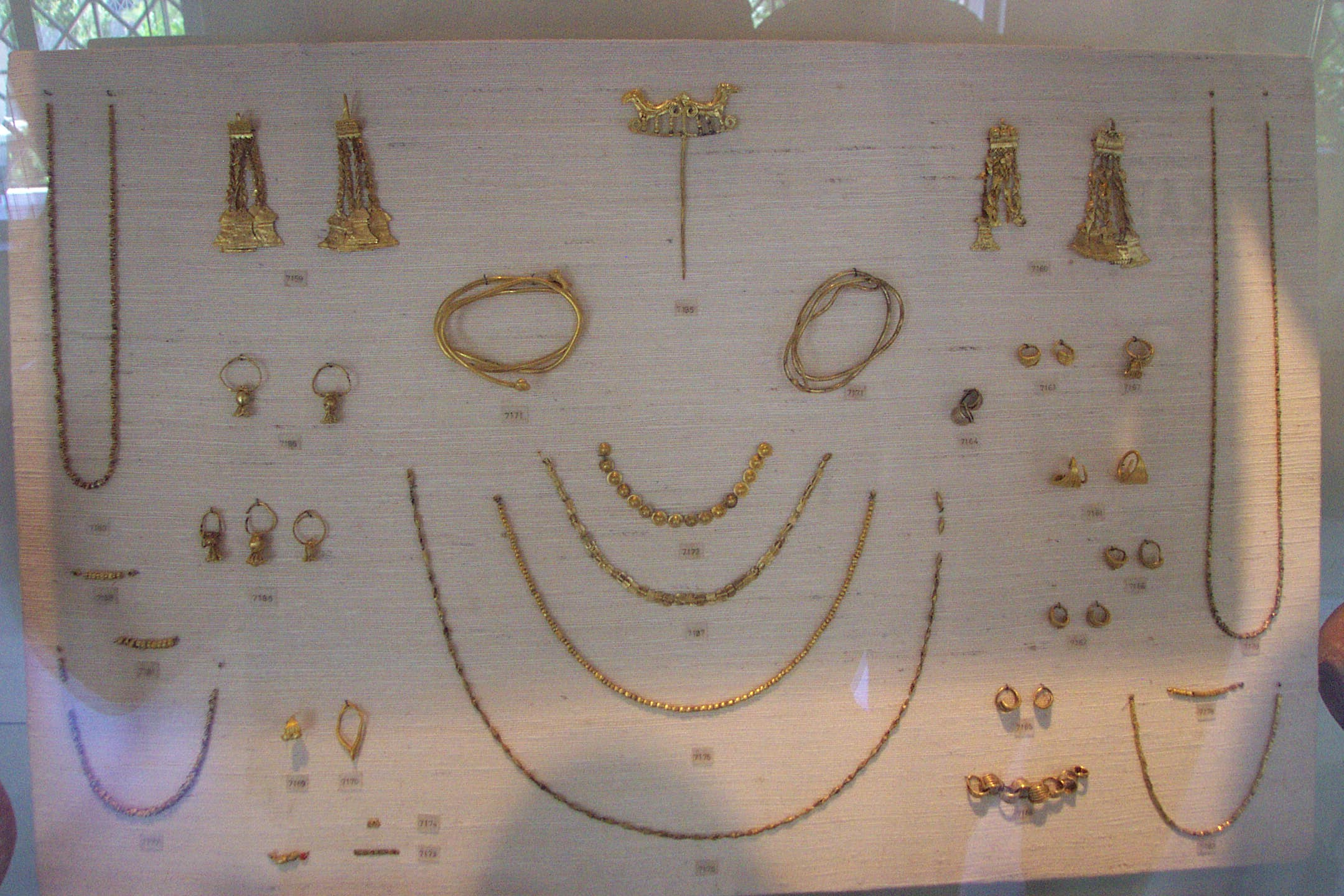

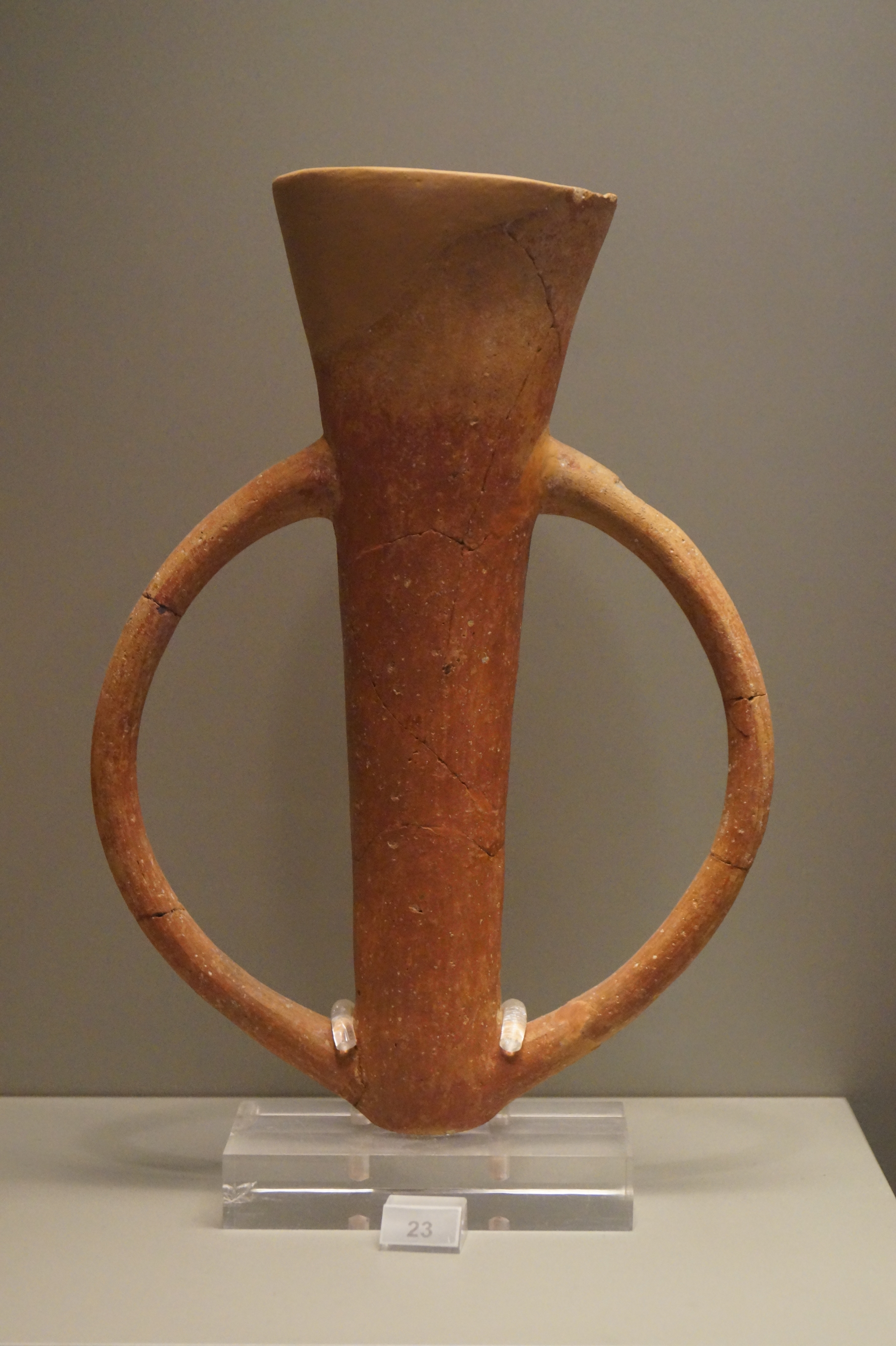

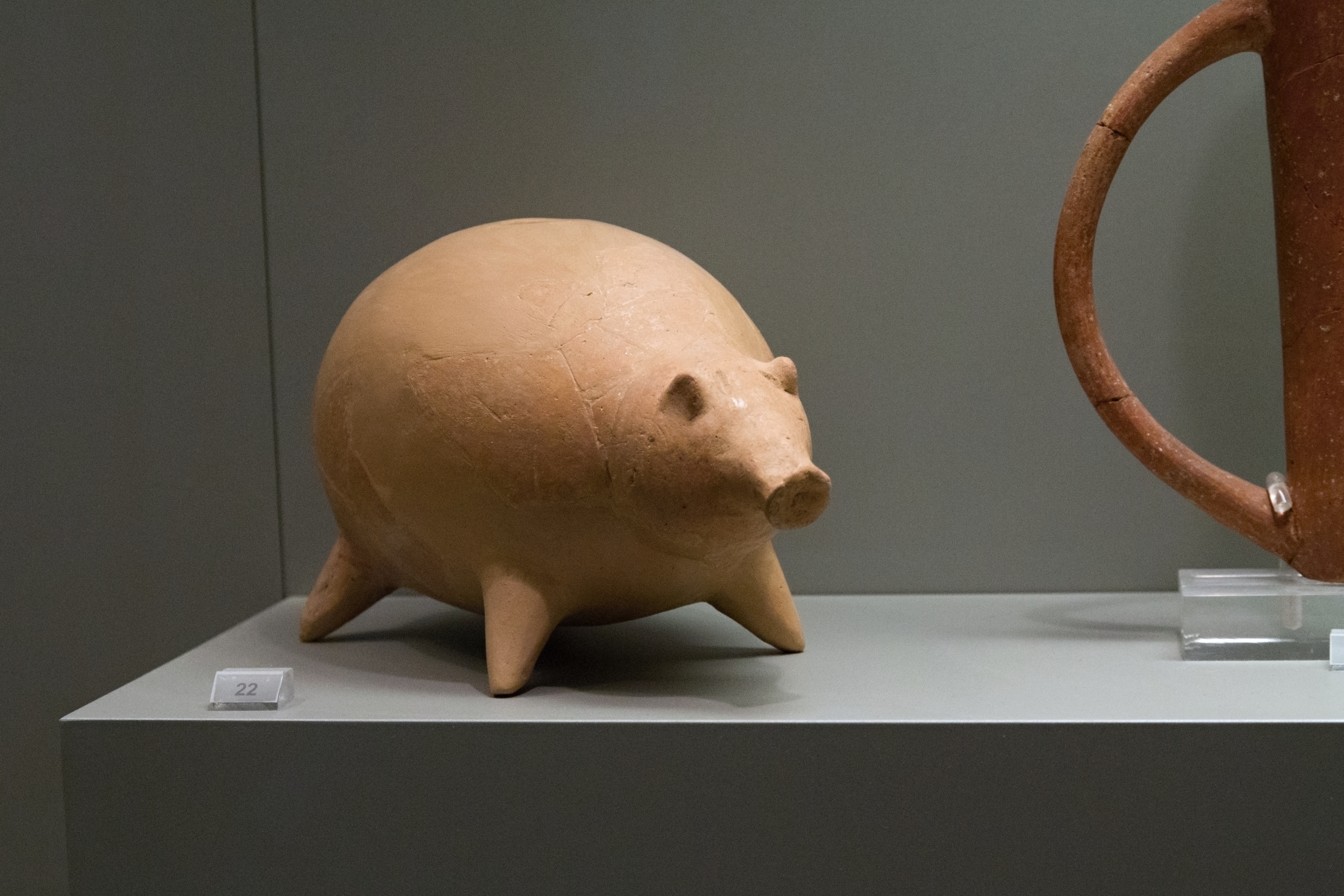

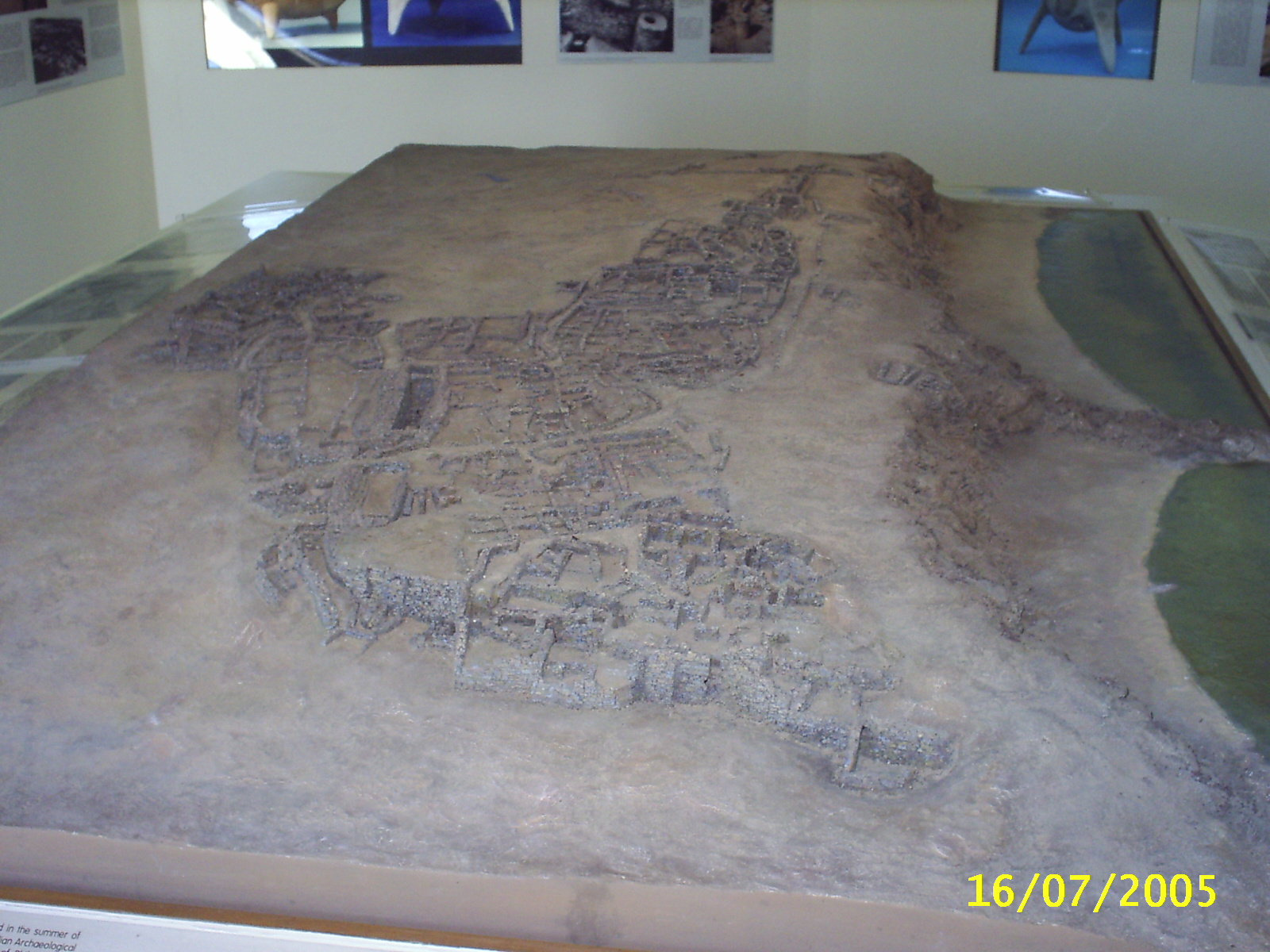

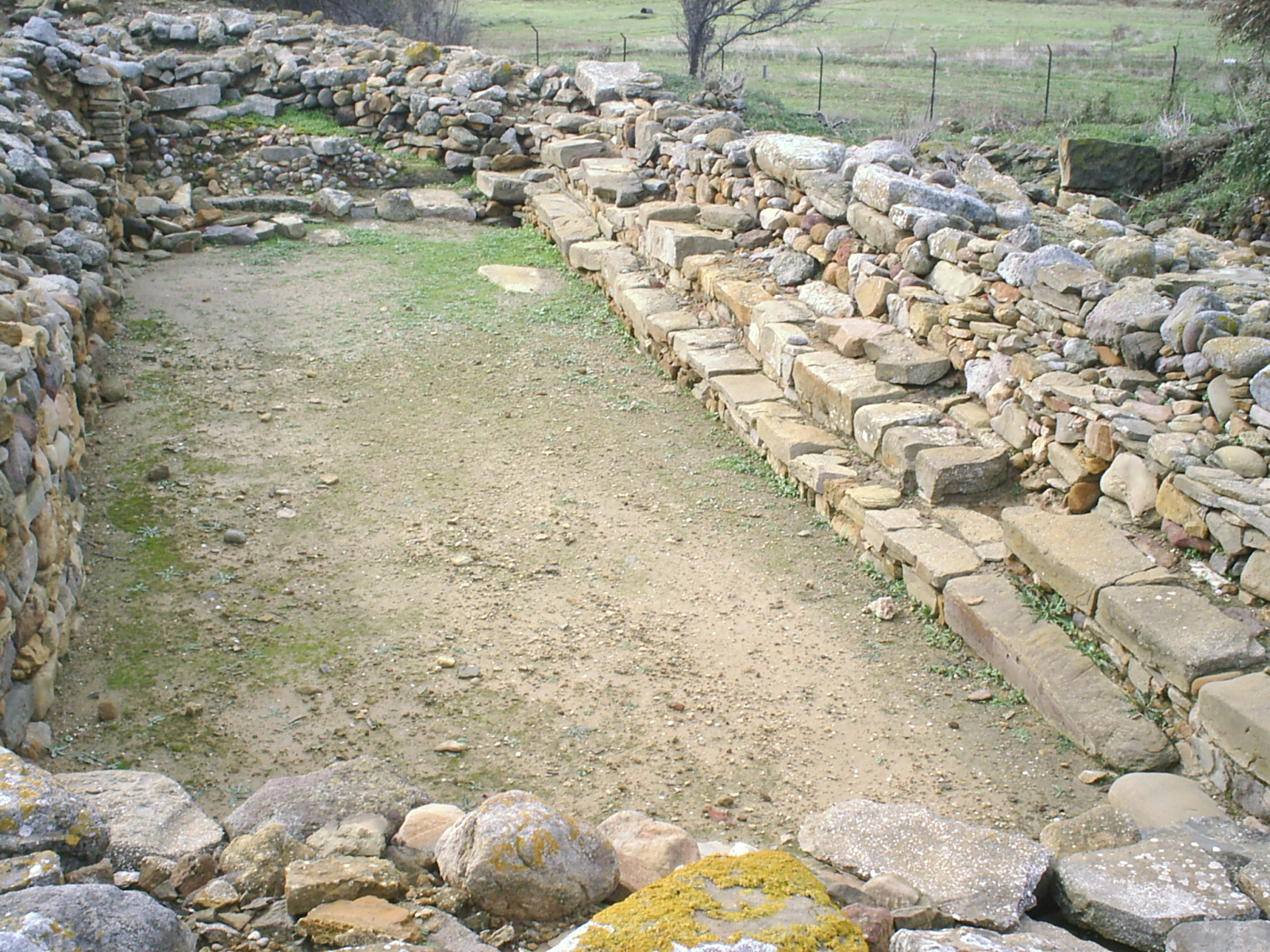

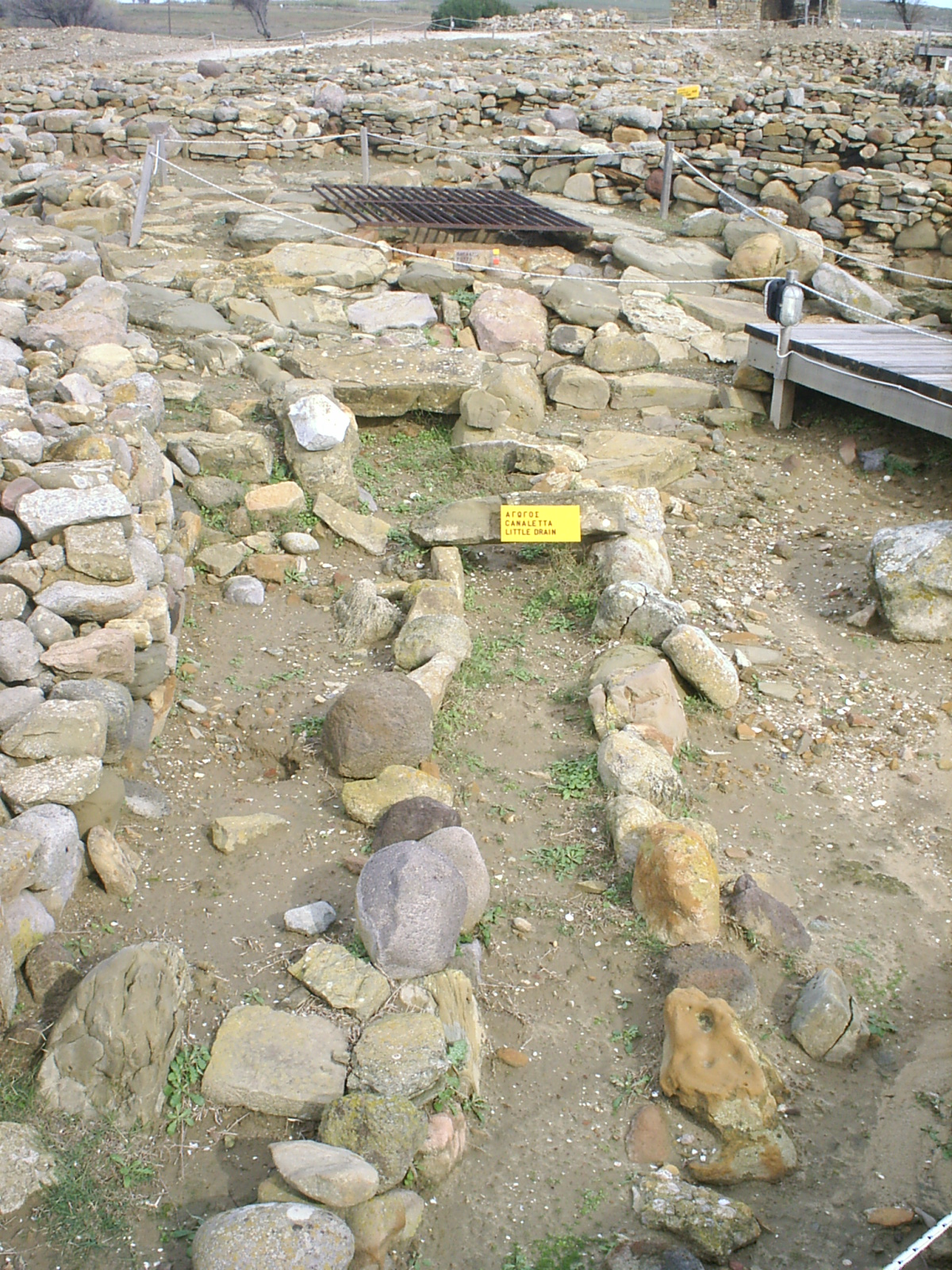

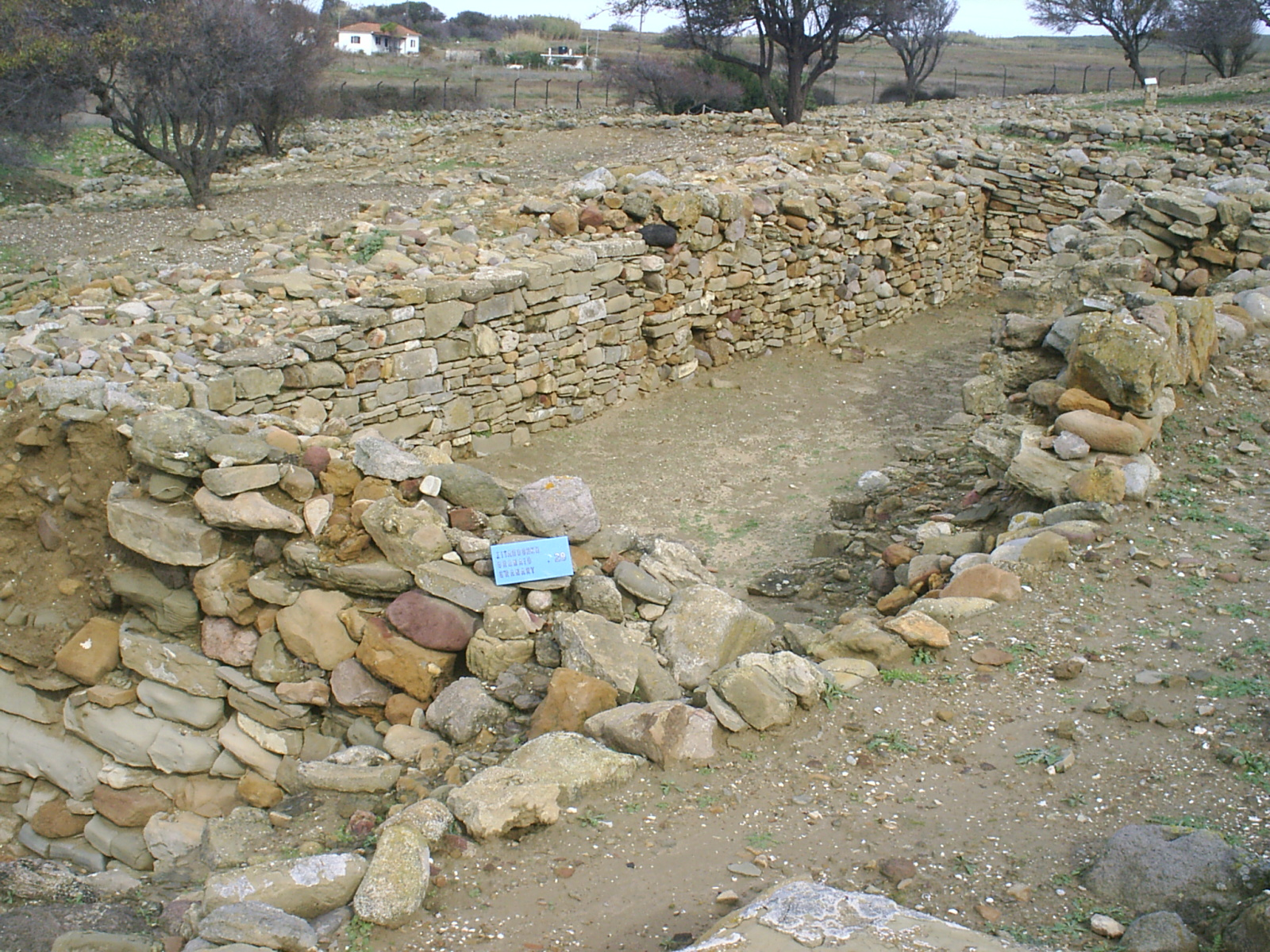

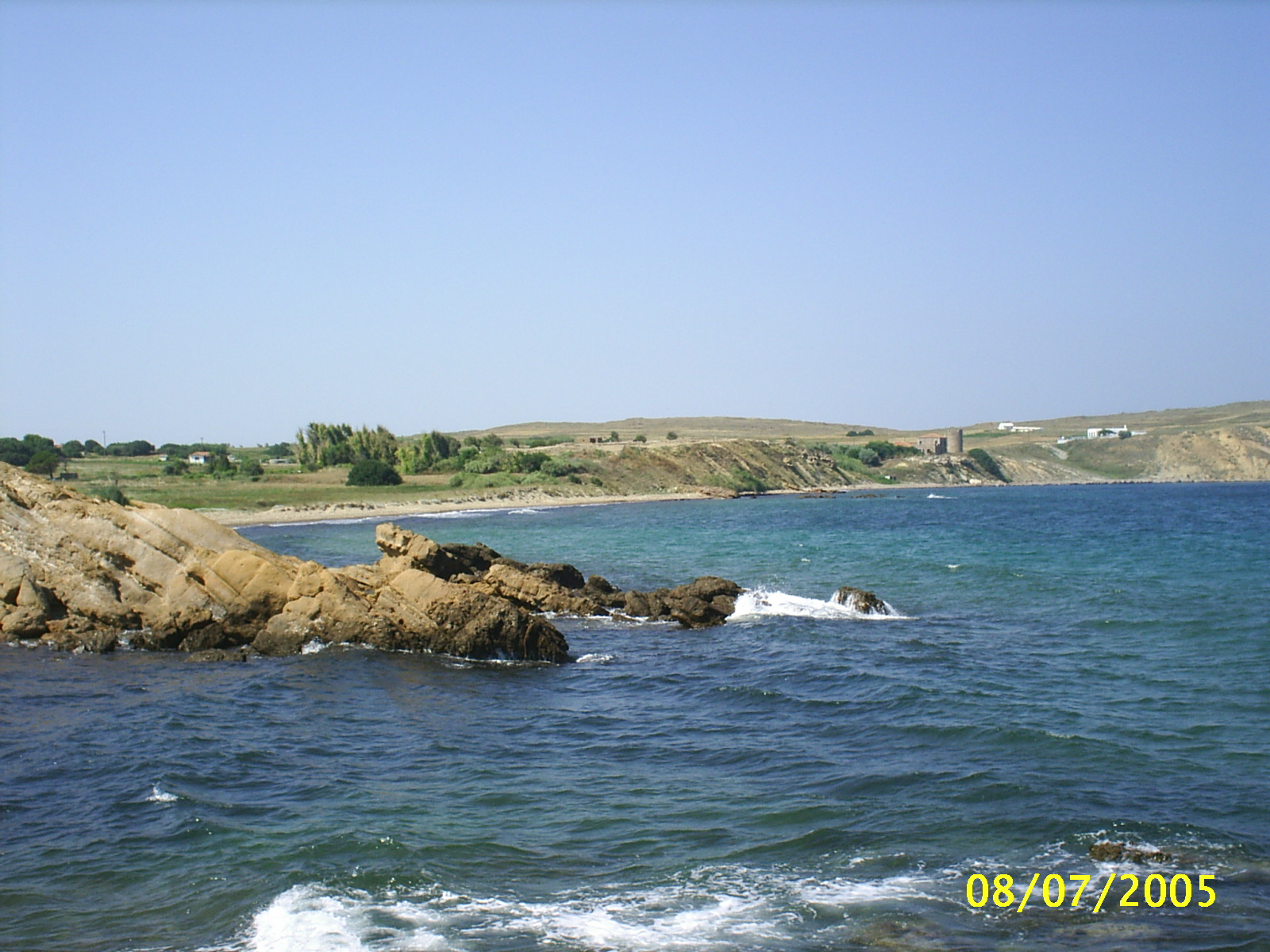

== See also ==
- Skarkos

== Bibliography ==
- Benvenuti, Alberto; Tine, Vincenzo; Traverso, Antonella (2022). "Πολιόχνη. Μιὰ νέα ἀνάγνωση τῆς οἰκιστικῆς ἐξέλιξης τῆς ΠΕΧ Ι-IΙ". Ἀρχαιολογικὴ Ἐφημερίς. 161: 85–140.
