= Arachnis citra =

Scientific classification
- Kingdom: Animalia
- Phylum: Arthropoda
- Class: Insecta
- Order: Lepidoptera
- Superfamily: Noctuoidea
- Family: Erebidae
- Subfamily: Arctiinae
- Genus: Arachnis
- Species: A. citra

Binomial name
- Arachnis citra Neumögen & Dyar, 1893

Synonyms
- Arachnis apachea Clarke, 1941; Arachnis midas Barnes & Lindsey, 1921; Arachnis picta var. citra Neumoegen & Dyar, 1893

Species of moth

Arachnis citra is a moth of the family Erebidae. It was described by Berthold Neumögen and Harrison Gray Dyar Jr. in 1893. It is found in North America, including Arizona, California, Colorado and Utah.

== Taxonomy ==
Arachnis citra was formerly listed as a subspecies Arachnis picta.

== Subspecies ==
- Arachnis citra citra
- Arachnis citra verna Barnes & McDunnough, 1918
