= Spilomela pantheralis =

Scientific classification
- Kingdom: Animalia
- Phylum: Arthropoda
- Clade: Pancrustacea
- Class: Insecta
- Order: Lepidoptera
- Family: Crambidae
- Genus: Spilomela
- Species: S. pantheralis

Binomial name
- Spilomela pantheralis (Geyer in Hübner, 1832)

Synonyms
- Ochlia pantheralis Geyer in Hübner, 1832; Ledereria seppalis Snellen, 1875; Zebronia ledalis Walker, 1859

Species of moth

Spilomela pantheralis is a moth in the family Crambidae. It is found in Colombia, Brazil, Ecuador, Panama and Costa Rica.
