= T. tricolor =

T. tricolor may refer to:

- Terebra tricolor, a sea snail species
- Tetrisia tricolor, a moth species found in tropical South America
- Tillandsia tricolor, a plant species native to Costa Rica and Mexico
- Thyroptera tricolor, the Spix's disk-winged bat, a bat species found from south Mexico to Bolivia

== Synonyms ==
- Thymallus tricolor, a synonym for Thymallus arcticus, the Arctic grayling, a freshwater fish species

== See also ==
- Tricolor (disambiguation)
