= Exophyla rectangularis =

Scientific classification
- Domain: Eukaryota
- Kingdom: Animalia
- Phylum: Arthropoda
- Class: Insecta
- Order: Lepidoptera
- Superfamily: Noctuoidea
- Family: Erebidae
- Genus: Exophyla
- Species: E. rectangularis

Binomial name
- Exophyla rectangularis Geyer, 1828

Synonyms
- Noctua rectangularis

Species of moth

Exophyla rectangularis is a moth of the family Noctuidae first described by Carl Geyer in 1828. It is found in Ukraine, Romania, Bulgaria, Albania, Greece, Montenegro, Croatia, northern Italy, Mediterranean Turkey, Lebanon, Israel and Turkmenistan.

There is one generation per year in the Middle East. Adults are on wing in early summer.

The larvae feed on Celtis, mostly Celtis australis.
