= Innominatum =

Innominatum may refer to:

- Dysschema innominatum, a moth of the family Erebidae
- Hip bone, also known as os innominatum in Latin
