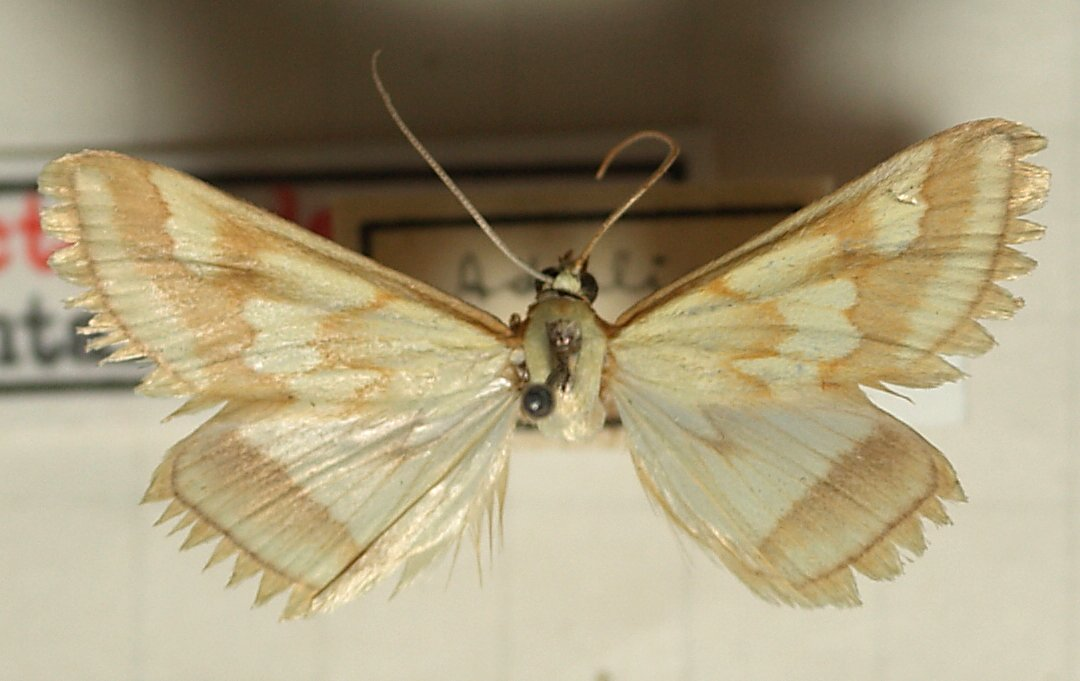

Scientific classification
- Kingdom: Animalia
- Phylum: Arthropoda
- Class: Insecta
- Order: Lepidoptera
- Family: Crambidae
- Genus: Ephelis
- Species: E. cruentalis

Binomial name
- Ephelis cruentalis (Geyer, 1832)

Synonyms
- Uresiphita cruentalis Geyer, 1832; Ephelis bourjotalis Duponchel, 1833; Ephelis badialis Treitschke, 1835; Pionea cruentalis

= Ephelis cruentalis =

Species of moth

Ephelis cruentalis is a species of moth in the family Crambidae. It was described by Carl Geyer in 1832. It is found in southern Europe, from France east to Italy and Greece to Turkey and further east into central Asia.

The wingspan is 18–23 mm.

The larvae feed on Hypericum species (St. John's worts).
