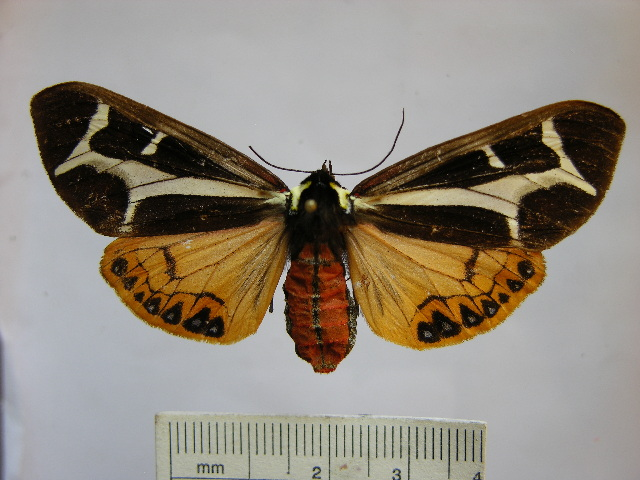

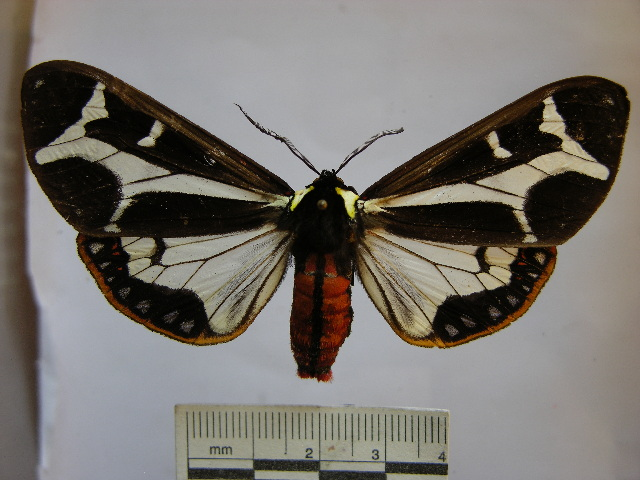

Scientific classification
- Kingdom: Animalia
- Phylum: Arthropoda
- Class: Insecta
- Order: Lepidoptera
- Superfamily: Noctuoidea
- Family: Erebidae
- Subfamily: Arctiinae
- Genus: Dysschema
- Species: D. thetis

Binomial name
- Dysschema thetis (Klug, 1836)

Synonyms
- Euprepia thetis Klug, 1836; Pericopis thetis; Daritis thetis var. howardi Edwards, 1887; Dysschema howardi

= Dysschema thetis =

Northern giant flag moth

Species of moth

Dysschema thetis, the northern giant flag moth, is a moth of the family Erebidae. The species was first described by Johann Christoph Friedrich Klug in 1836. It is found from the south-western United States to north-western Mexico.

The wingspan is 85–95 mm.

The larvae feed on Asteraceae species.

== Taxonomy ==
Dysschema thetis and Dysschema mariamne have historically been regarded as synonyms; however, the lectotype of thetis belongs to the same population historically known as D. howardi, therefore making these two synonyms, while mariamne is the correct name for the more southern species.
