= Arachnis aulaea =

Scientific classification
- Domain: Eukaryota
- Kingdom: Animalia
- Phylum: Arthropoda
- Class: Insecta
- Order: Lepidoptera
- Superfamily: Noctuoidea
- Family: Erebidae
- Subfamily: Arctiinae
- Genus: Arachnis
- Species: A. aulaea

Binomial name
- Arachnis aulaea (Geyer, 1837)

Synonyms
- Ecpantheria incarnata Walker, 1855

Species of moth

Arachnis aulaea, the aulaean tiger-moth or tiger moth, is a moth of the family Erebidae. It was described by Carl Geyer in 1837. It is found from southern Arizona in the United States to Guatemala.

== Subspecies ==
- Arachnis aulaea aulaea
- Arachnis aulaea pompeia Druce, 1894
