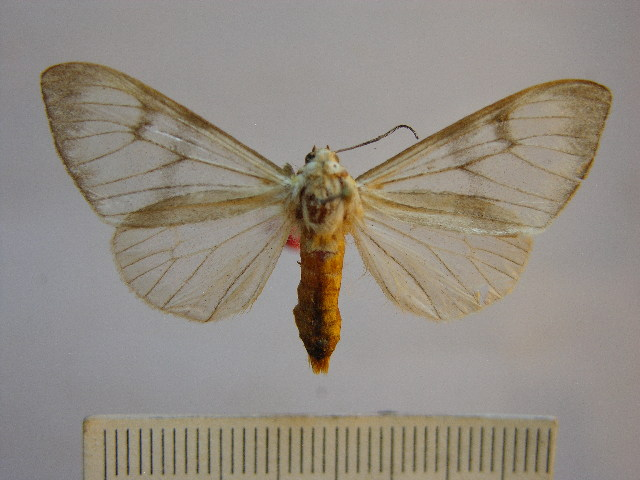

Scientific classification
- Domain: Eukaryota
- Kingdom: Animalia
- Phylum: Arthropoda
- Class: Insecta
- Order: Lepidoptera
- Superfamily: Noctuoidea
- Family: Erebidae
- Subfamily: Arctiinae
- Genus: Dysschema
- Species: D. amphissum

Binomial name
- Dysschema amphissum (Geyer, 1832)

Synonyms
- Episteme amphissum Geyer, 1832; Episteme amphissa; Dysschema amphissa; Pericopis fenestrata Walker, 1855; Pericopis vestalis Butler, 1871; Pericopis f. subguttata Walker, 1854

= Dysschema amphissum =

Species of moth

Dysschema amphissum is a moth of the family Erebidae first described by Carl Geyer in 1832. It is found in south-eastern Brazil, ranging from southern Minas Gerais and Rio de Janeiro, south to Rio Grande do Sul.

Females are diurnal and mimic Actinote species.
