= Arachnis =

Arachnis may refer to:

- Arachnis (moth), a genus of moth
- Arachnis (plant), a genus of orchid
- Arachnis, a ring name of German professional wrestler Achim Albrecht.

== See also ==
- Arachnid
