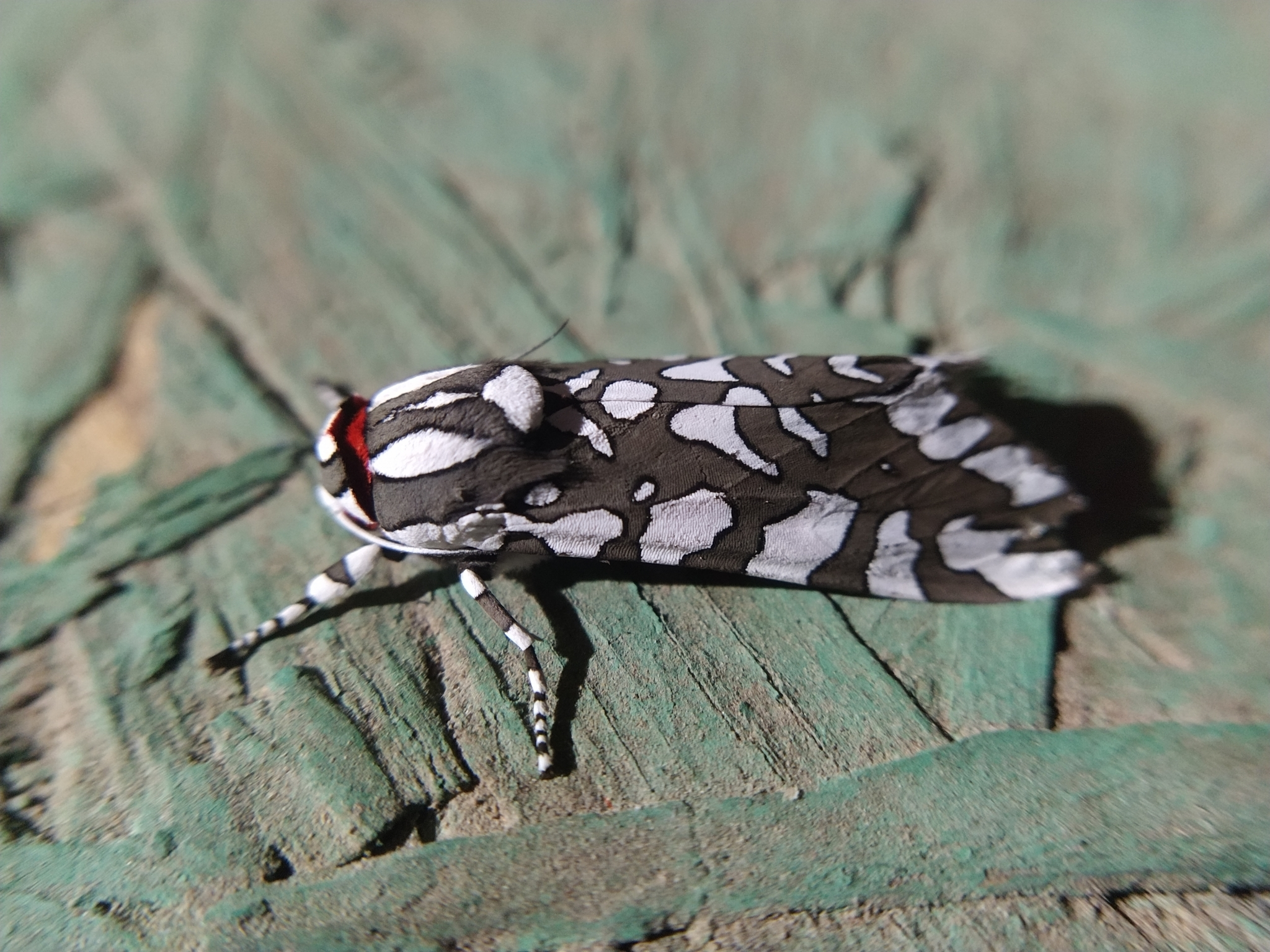

Scientific classification
- Domain: Eukaryota
- Kingdom: Animalia
- Phylum: Arthropoda
- Class: Insecta
- Order: Lepidoptera
- Superfamily: Noctuoidea
- Family: Erebidae
- Subfamily: Arctiinae
- Genus: Arachnis
- Species: A. dilecta

Binomial name
- Arachnis dilecta (Boisduval, 1870)

Synonyms
- Spilosoma dilecta Boisduval, 1870; Ecpantheria sanguinea Oberthür, 1881

= Arachnis dilecta =

Species of moth

Arachnis dilecta is a moth of the family Erebidae. It was described by Jean Baptiste Boisduval in 1870. It is found in Mexico and Honduras.
