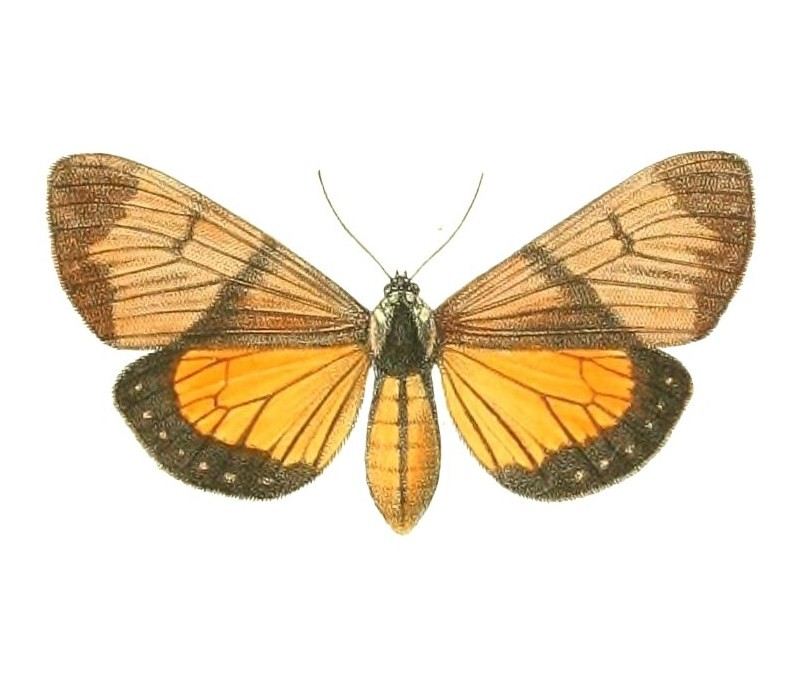

Scientific classification
- Kingdom: Animalia
- Phylum: Arthropoda
- Class: Insecta
- Order: Lepidoptera
- Superfamily: Noctuoidea
- Family: Erebidae
- Subfamily: Arctiinae
- Genus: Dysschema
- Species: D. neda

Binomial name
- Dysschema neda (Klug, 1836)

Synonyms
- Euprepia neda Klug, 1836; Pericopis f. nubila Walker, 1854; Pericopis submarginata Walker, 1854

= Dysschema neda =

Species of moth

Dysschema neda is a moth of the family Erebidae first described by Johann Christoph Friedrich Klug in 1936. It is found in Brazil.
