= Dysschema lunifera =

Scientific classification
- Domain: Eukaryota
- Kingdom: Animalia
- Phylum: Arthropoda
- Class: Insecta
- Order: Lepidoptera
- Superfamily: Noctuoidea
- Family: Erebidae
- Subfamily: Arctiinae
- Genus: Dysschema
- Species: D. lunifera

Binomial name
- Dysschema lunifera (Butler, 1871)

Synonyms
- Pericopis lunifera Butler, 1871

Species of moth

Dysschema lunifera is a moth of the family Erebidae. It was described by Arthur Gardiner Butler in 1871. It is found in Bahia, Brazil.
