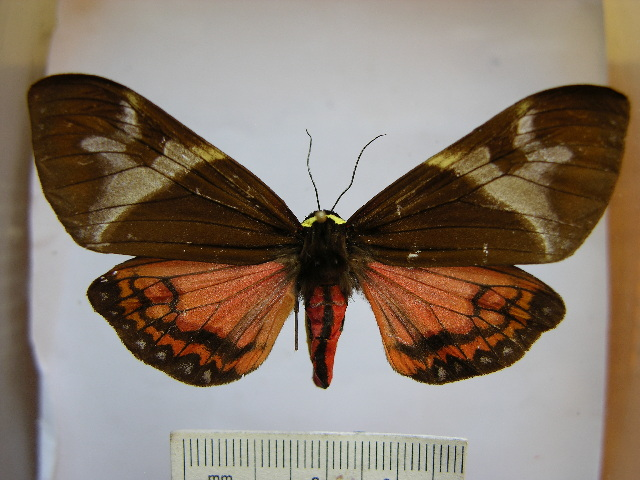

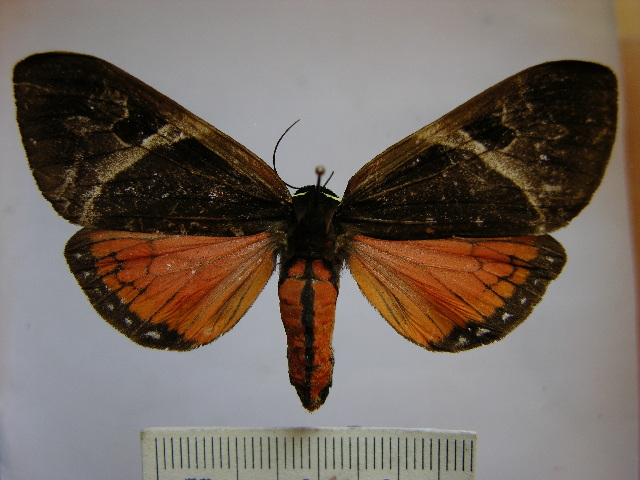

Scientific classification
- Domain: Eukaryota
- Kingdom: Animalia
- Phylum: Arthropoda
- Class: Insecta
- Order: Lepidoptera
- Superfamily: Noctuoidea
- Family: Erebidae
- Subfamily: Arctiinae
- Genus: Dysschema
- Species: D. lygdamis

Binomial name
- Dysschema lygdamis (H. Druce, 1884)

Synonyms
- Pericopis lygdamis H. Druce, 1884; Pericopis fortis Schaus, 1910; Dysschema fortis; Pericopis marginalis f. tibesina Hering, 1930; Pericopis ultima Hering, 1926; Dysschema ultima; Pericopis viduopsis Hering, 1926; Dysschema viduopsis

= Dysschema lygdamis =

Species of moth

Dysschema lygdamis is a moth of the family Erebidae first described by Herbert Druce in 1884. It seems restricted to the mountains of Costa Rica and Panama.
