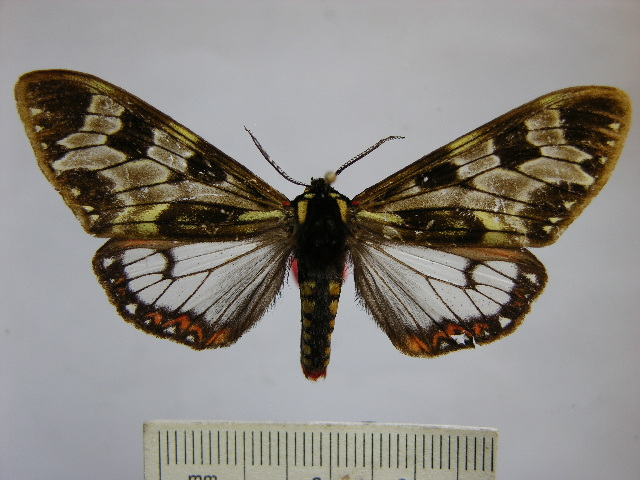

Scientific classification
- Domain: Eukaryota
- Kingdom: Animalia
- Phylum: Arthropoda
- Class: Insecta
- Order: Lepidoptera
- Superfamily: Noctuoidea
- Family: Erebidae
- Subfamily: Arctiinae
- Genus: Dysschema
- Species: D. palmeri

Binomial name
- Dysschema palmeri (H. Druce, 1910)

Synonyms
- Pericopis palmeri H. Druce, 1910

= Dysschema palmeri =

Species of moth

Dysschema palmeri is a moth of the family Erebidae first described by Herbert Druce in 1910. It is found in Colombia and Peru.
