= Spilomela pervialis =

Scientific classification
- Kingdom: Animalia
- Phylum: Arthropoda
- Clade: Pancrustacea
- Class: Insecta
- Order: Lepidoptera
- Family: Crambidae
- Genus: Spilomela
- Species: S. pervialis

Binomial name
- Spilomela pervialis Herrich-Schäffer, 1871

Species of moth

Spilomela pervialis is a moth in the family Crambidae. It is found in Cuba.
