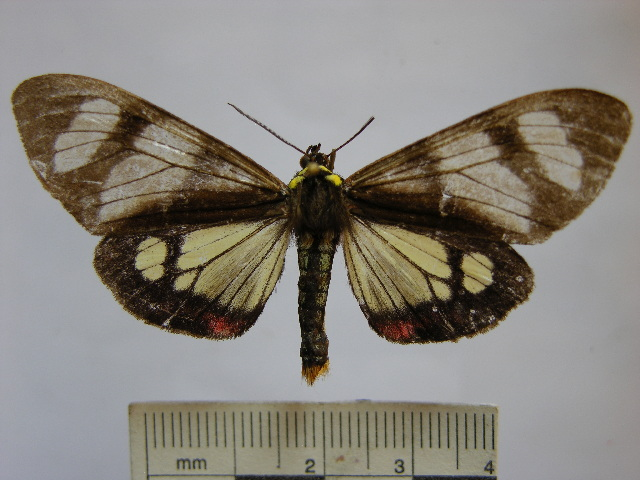

Scientific classification
- Domain: Eukaryota
- Kingdom: Animalia
- Phylum: Arthropoda
- Class: Insecta
- Order: Lepidoptera
- Superfamily: Noctuoidea
- Family: Erebidae
- Subfamily: Arctiinae
- Genus: Dysschema
- Species: D. flavopennis

Binomial name
- Dysschema flavopennis (Rebel, 1901)

Synonyms
- Pericopis flavopennis Rebel, 1901

= Dysschema flavopennis =

Species of moth

Dysschema flavopennis is a moth of the family Erebidae first described by Hans Rebel in 1901. It is found in Colombia.
