= Dysschema intermedium =

Scientific classification
- Domain: Eukaryota
- Kingdom: Animalia
- Phylum: Arthropoda
- Class: Insecta
- Order: Lepidoptera
- Superfamily: Noctuoidea
- Family: Erebidae
- Subfamily: Arctiinae
- Genus: Dysschema
- Species: D. intermedium

Binomial name
- Dysschema intermedium Becker, 2013

Species of moth

Dysschema intermedium is a moth of the family Erebidae first described by Vitor Osmar Becker in 2013. It is found in Guatemala.

The length of the forewings is 35 mm for males and 37–40 mm for females.
