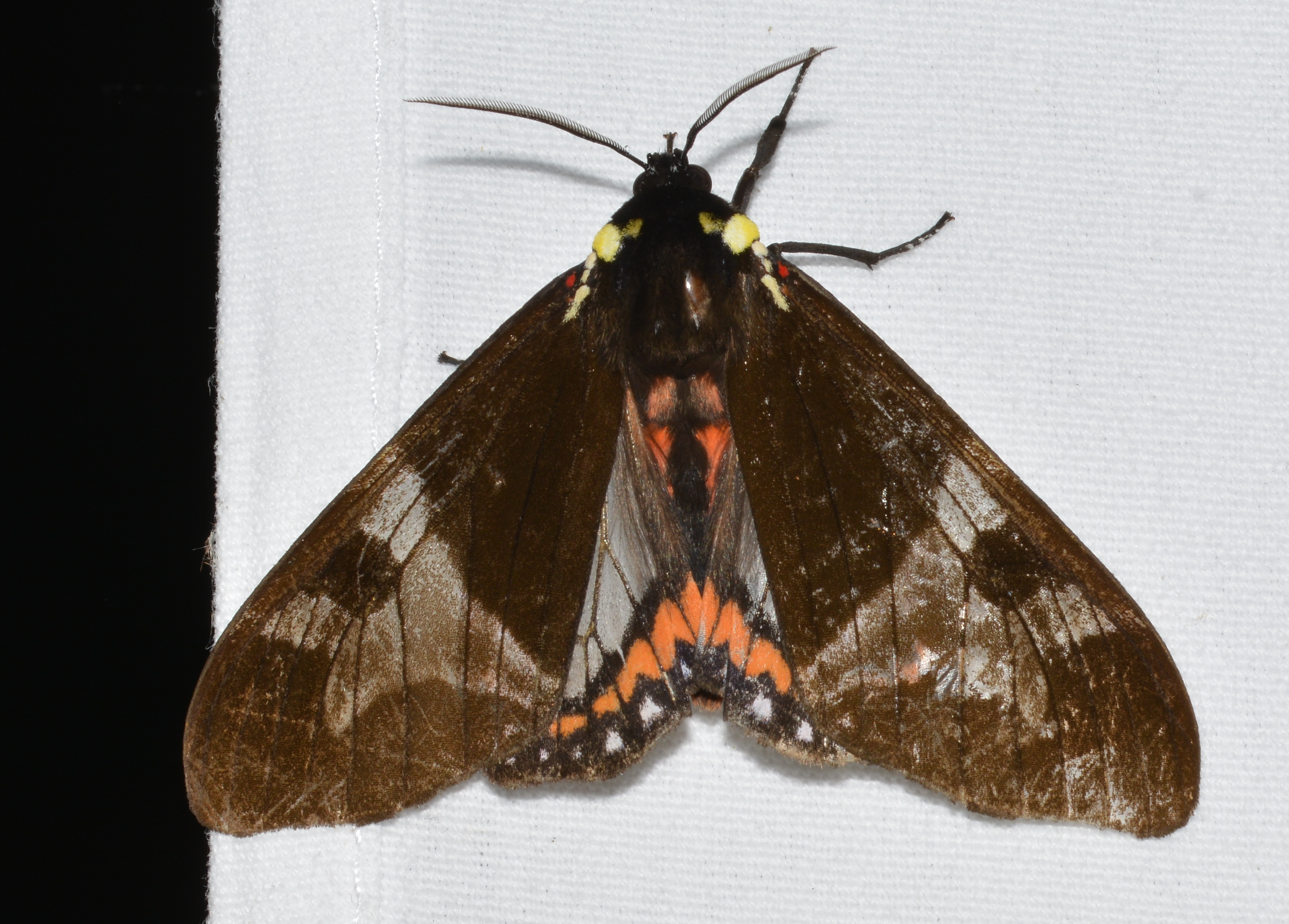

Scientific classification
- Domain: Eukaryota
- Kingdom: Animalia
- Phylum: Arthropoda
- Class: Insecta
- Order: Lepidoptera
- Superfamily: Noctuoidea
- Family: Erebidae
- Subfamily: Arctiinae
- Genus: Dysschema
- Species: D. magdala

Binomial name
- Dysschema magdala (Boisduval, 1870)

Synonyms
- Dorimena magdala Boisduval, 1870; Pericopis panamensis Hering, 1925

= Dysschema magdala =

Species of moth

Dysschema magdala is a moth of the family Erebidae. It was described by Jean Baptiste Boisduval in 1870. It is found in Guatemala, Costa Rica and Panama.
