= Dysschema subapicalis =

Scientific classification
- Kingdom: Animalia
- Phylum: Arthropoda
- Class: Insecta
- Order: Lepidoptera
- Superfamily: Noctuoidea
- Family: Erebidae
- Subfamily: Arctiinae
- Genus: Dysschema
- Species: D. subapicalis

Binomial name
- Dysschema subapicalis (Walker, 1854)

Synonyms
- Pericopis subapicalis Walker, 1854; Pericopis f. parnassiodes Walker, 1854; Addua inclusa Walker, 1862; Pericopis tristis Walker, 1869; Pericopis noctuites Butler, 1872; Pericopis pagasa Dognin, 1919

Species of moth

Dysschema subapicalis is a moth of the family Erebidae first described by Francis Walker in 1854. It is restricted to the Atlantic forests of south-eastern Brazil.

Adults are sexually dimorphic.
