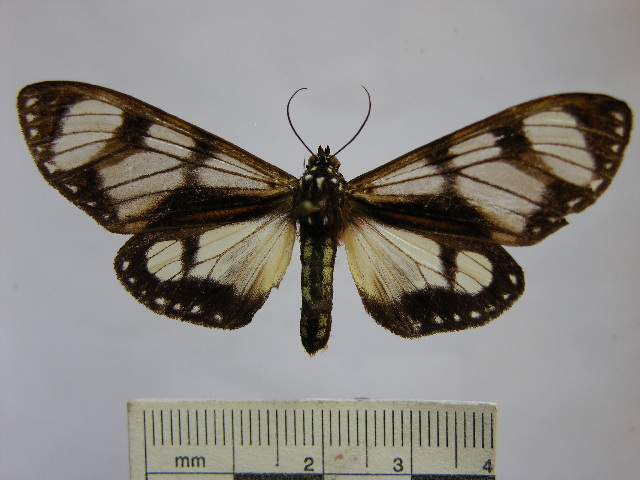

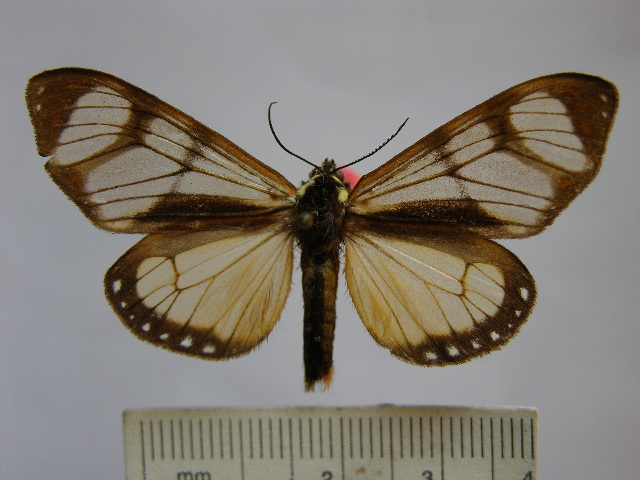

Scientific classification
- Domain: Eukaryota
- Kingdom: Animalia
- Phylum: Arthropoda
- Class: Insecta
- Order: Lepidoptera
- Superfamily: Noctuoidea
- Family: Erebidae
- Subfamily: Arctiinae
- Genus: Dysschema
- Species: D. thyridinum

Binomial name
- Dysschema thyridinum (Butler, 1871)

Synonyms
- Pericopis thyridinum Butler, 1871; Dysschema thyridina; Pericopis damon Druce, 1910; Dysschema damon; Pericopis grassator Hering, 1925; Dysschema grassator; Pericopis mosera Druce, 1907; Dysschema mosera; Pericopis sylvia Druce, 1910; Pericopis talboti Dognin, 1922; Dysschema talboti

= Dysschema thyridinum =

Species of moth

Dysschema thyridinum is a moth of the family Erebidae first described by Arthur Gardiner Butler in 1871. It is found in Ecuador and Peru.
