= Dysschema montezuma =

Scientific classification
- Domain: Eukaryota
- Kingdom: Animalia
- Phylum: Arthropoda
- Class: Insecta
- Order: Lepidoptera
- Superfamily: Noctuoidea
- Family: Erebidae
- Subfamily: Arctiinae
- Genus: Dysschema
- Species: D. montezuma

Binomial name
- Dysschema montezuma (Schaus, 1892)

Synonyms
- Pericopis montezuma Schaus, 1892

Species of moth

Dysschema montezuma is a moth of the family Erebidae. It was described by Schaus in 1892. It is found in Mexico.
