= Dysschema brunnea =

Scientific classification
- Domain: Eukaryota
- Kingdom: Animalia
- Phylum: Arthropoda
- Class: Insecta
- Order: Lepidoptera
- Superfamily: Noctuoidea
- Family: Erebidae
- Subfamily: Arctiinae
- Genus: Dysschema
- Species: D. brunnea

Binomial name
- Dysschema brunnea (H. Druce, 1911)

Synonyms
- Pericopis brunnea H. Druce, 1911

Species of moth

Dysschema brunnea is a moth of the family Erebidae. It was described by Herbert Druce in 1911. It is found in Ecuador.
