= Ephelis flavomarginalis =

Scientific classification
- Kingdom: Animalia
- Phylum: Arthropoda
- Class: Insecta
- Order: Lepidoptera
- Family: Crambidae
- Genus: Ephelis
- Species: E. flavomarginalis

Binomial name
- Ephelis flavomarginalis (Amsel, 1951)

Synonyms
- Heliothela flavomarginalis Amsel, 1951; Emprepes flavomarginalis

Species of moth

Ephelis flavomarginalis is a moth in the family Crambidae. It is found in the United Arab Emirates and Iran.
