= Dysschema viuda =

Scientific classification
- Domain: Eukaryota
- Kingdom: Animalia
- Phylum: Arthropoda
- Class: Insecta
- Order: Lepidoptera
- Superfamily: Noctuoidea
- Family: Erebidae
- Subfamily: Arctiinae
- Genus: Dysschema
- Species: D. viuda

Binomial name
- Dysschema viuda (Schaus, 1910)

Synonyms
- Pericopis viuda Schaus, 1910; Centronia joiceyi Dognin, 1923; Dysschema joiceyi

Species of moth

Dysschema viuda is a moth of the family Erebidae first described by William Schaus in 1910. It is found from Costa Rica to Ecuador.
