= Dysschema forbesi =

Scientific classification
- Domain: Eukaryota
- Kingdom: Animalia
- Phylum: Arthropoda
- Class: Insecta
- Order: Lepidoptera
- Superfamily: Noctuoidea
- Family: Erebidae
- Subfamily: Arctiinae
- Genus: Dysschema
- Species: D. forbesi

Binomial name
- Dysschema forbesi (H. Druce, 1907)

Synonyms
- Pericopis forbesi H. Druce, 1907; Pericopis evanescens Hering, 1925; Dysschema evanescens

Species of moth

Dysschema forbesi is a moth of the family Erebidae first described by Herbert Druce in 1907. It is found in Brazil.
