= Dysschema humeralis =

Scientific classification
- Kingdom: Animalia
- Phylum: Arthropoda
- Class: Insecta
- Order: Lepidoptera
- Superfamily: Noctuoidea
- Family: Erebidae
- Subfamily: Arctiinae
- Genus: Dysschema
- Species: D. humeralis

Binomial name
- Dysschema humeralis (Walker, 1854)

Synonyms
- Pericopis humeralis Walker, 1854

Species of moth

Dysschema humeralis is a moth of the family Erebidae. It was described by Francis Walker in 1854. It is found in Mexico.
