= Spilomela minoralis =

Scientific classification
- Kingdom: Animalia
- Phylum: Arthropoda
- Clade: Pancrustacea
- Class: Insecta
- Order: Lepidoptera
- Family: Crambidae
- Genus: Spilomela
- Species: S. minoralis

Binomial name
- Spilomela minoralis Hampson, 1912

Synonyms
- Zebronia minoralis

Species of moth

Spilomela minoralis is a moth in the family Crambidae. It is found in Guyana. It has also been reported from Cuba.

The wingspan is about 20 mm. The forewings are semihyaline white with a fuscous brown subbasal band, a slightly curved antemedial band and a postmedial band which is connected to a patch at the tornus. There is also a wedge-shaped terminal patch, divided by a white subterminal line. The hindwings are semihyaline white with oblique fuscous medial and postmedial bands, as well as a subterminal and terminal band.
