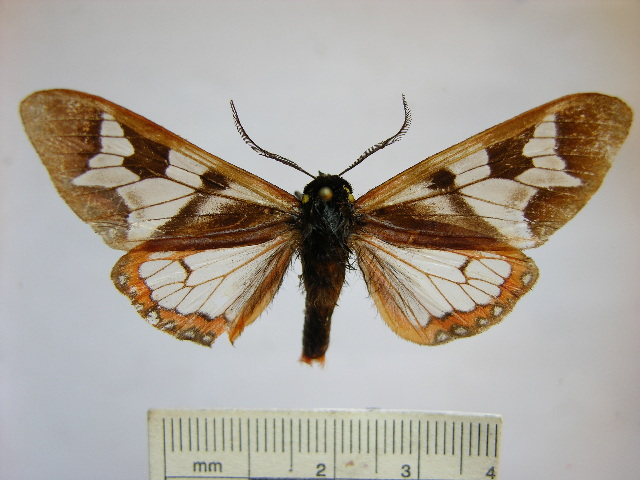

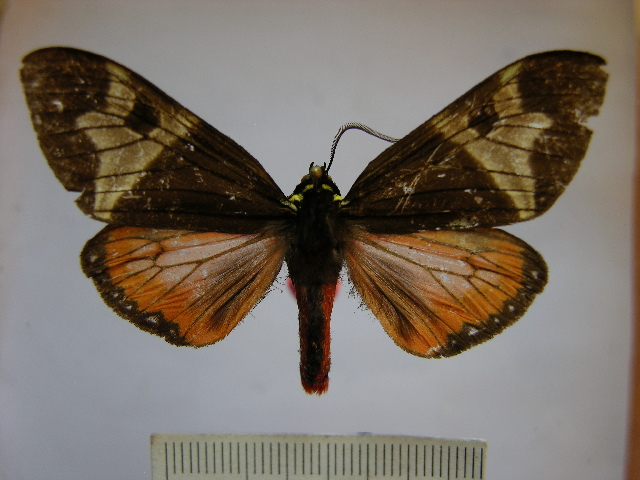

Scientific classification
- Domain: Eukaryota
- Kingdom: Animalia
- Phylum: Arthropoda
- Class: Insecta
- Order: Lepidoptera
- Superfamily: Noctuoidea
- Family: Erebidae
- Subfamily: Arctiinae
- Genus: Dysschema
- Species: D. leda

Binomial name
- Dysschema leda (H. Druce, 1884)

Synonyms
- Pericopis leda H. Druce, 1884; Pericopis paracelsus Hering, 1926; Dysschema paracelsus

= Dysschema leda =

Species of moth

Dysschema leda is a moth of the family Erebidae first described by Herbert Druce in 1884. It is found in Costa Rica.
