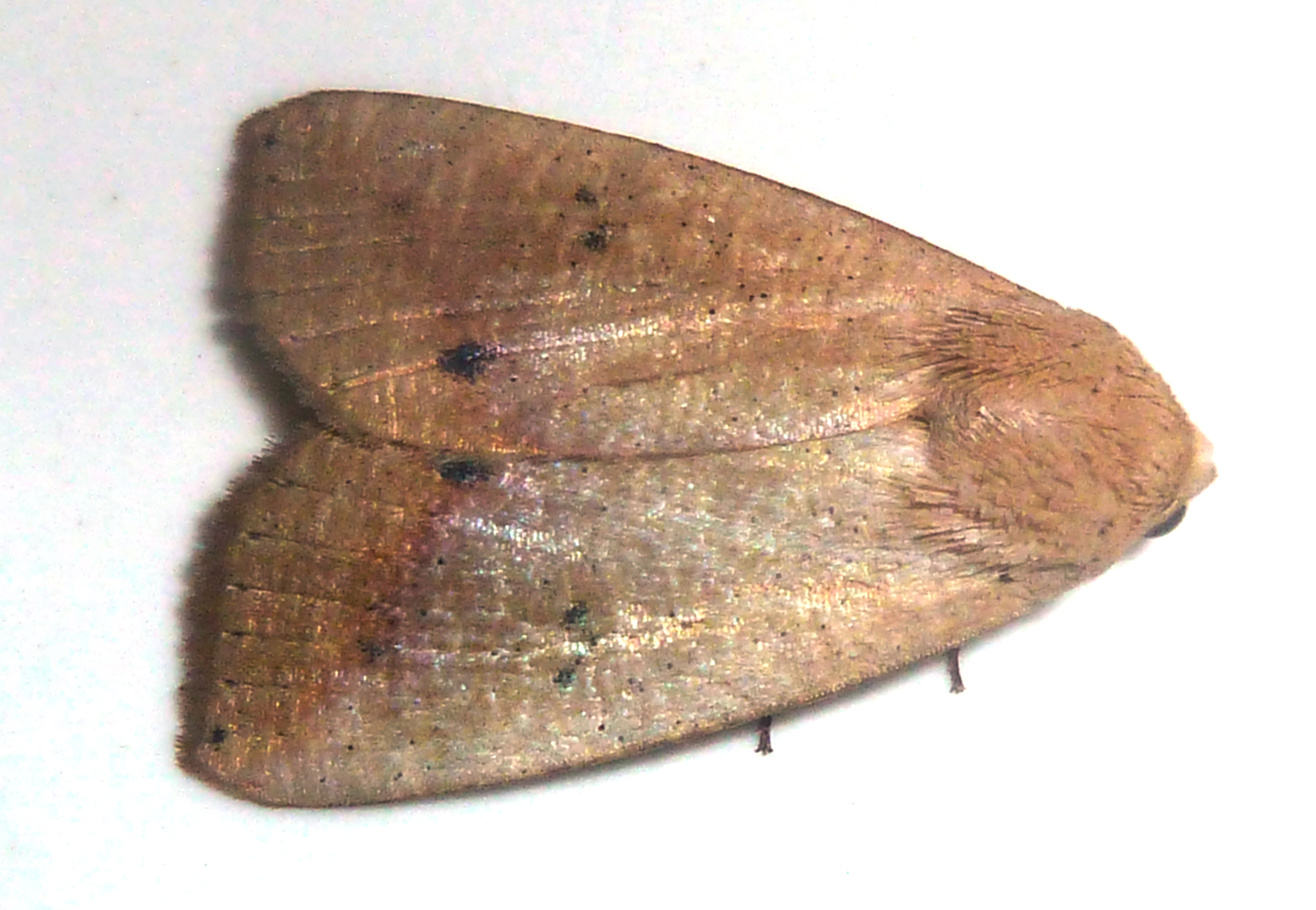
- E. multistriata

Scientific classification
- Kingdom: Animalia
- Phylum: Arthropoda
- Class: Insecta
- Order: Lepidoptera
- Superfamily: Noctuoidea
- Family: Erebidae
- Subfamily: Calpinae
- Genus: Exophyla; Guenée, 1841

= Exophyla =

Genus of moths

Exophyla is a genus of moths of the family Noctuidae.

== Species ==
- Exophyla flexularis Mabille, 1890
- Exophyla melanocleis Hampson, 1926
- Exophyla molybdea Hampson, 1926
- Exophyla multistriata Hampson, 1910
- Exophyla platti Prout, 1925
- Exophyla poliotis Hampson, 1902
- Exophyla rectangularis Geyer, [1828]
