= Dysschema dissimulata =

Scientific classification
- Kingdom: Animalia
- Phylum: Arthropoda
- Class: Insecta
- Order: Lepidoptera
- Superfamily: Noctuoidea
- Family: Erebidae
- Subfamily: Arctiinae
- Genus: Dysschema
- Species: D. dissimulata

Binomial name
- Dysschema dissimulata (Walker, [1865])

Synonyms
- Pericopis dissimulata Walker, [1865]; Pericopis madana Druce, 1910; Pericopis f. nigerrima Hering, 1926; Pericopis f. nigrodiscalis Hering, 1926

Species of moth

Dysschema dissimulata is a moth of the family Erebidae. It was described by Francis Walker in 1865. It is found in Colombia and Ecuador.
