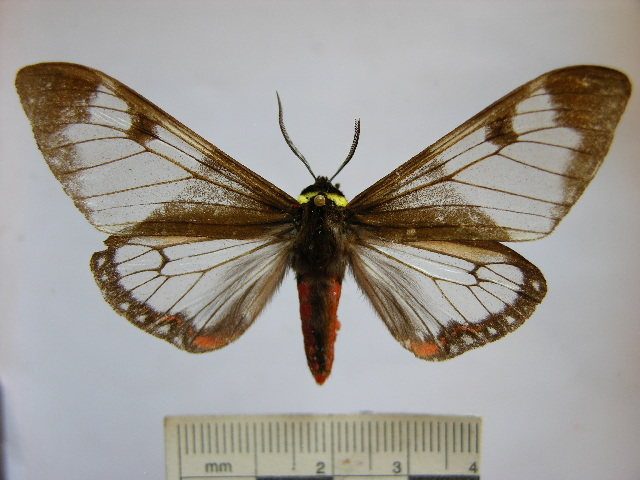

Scientific classification
- Kingdom: Animalia
- Phylum: Arthropoda
- Class: Insecta
- Order: Lepidoptera
- Superfamily: Noctuoidea
- Family: Erebidae
- Subfamily: Arctiinae
- Genus: Dysschema
- Species: D. marginalis

Binomial name
- Dysschema marginalis (Walker, 1855)

Synonyms
- Daritis marginalis Walker, 1855; Pericopis crassifascia Hering, 1925; Pericopis dissimulans Walker, [1865]

= Dysschema marginalis =

Species of moth

Dysschema marginalis is a moth of the family Erebidae first described by Francis Walker in 1855. It is found in Venezuela, Ecuador and Colombia.
