= Dysschema rosina =

Scientific classification
- Domain: Eukaryota
- Kingdom: Animalia
- Phylum: Arthropoda
- Class: Insecta
- Order: Lepidoptera
- Superfamily: Noctuoidea
- Family: Erebidae
- Subfamily: Arctiinae
- Genus: Dysschema
- Species: D. rosina

Binomial name
- Dysschema rosina (Butler, 1871)

Synonyms
- Pericopis rosina Butler, 1871; Pericopis nigriventralis Dognin, 1923; Dysschema nigriventralis

Species of moth

Dysschema rosina is a moth of the family Erebidae. It was described by Arthur Gardiner Butler in 1871. It is found in Brazil.
