= Arachnis tristis =

Scientific classification
- Domain: Eukaryota
- Kingdom: Animalia
- Phylum: Arthropoda
- Class: Insecta
- Order: Lepidoptera
- Superfamily: Noctuoidea
- Family: Erebidae
- Subfamily: Arctiinae
- Genus: Arachnis
- Species: A. tristis

Binomial name
- Arachnis tristis Rothschild, 1935

Synonyms
- Arachnis bituminosa Seitz, 1919

Species of moth

Arachnis tristis is a moth of the family Erebidae. It was described by Walter Rothschild in 1935. It is found in Mexico.
