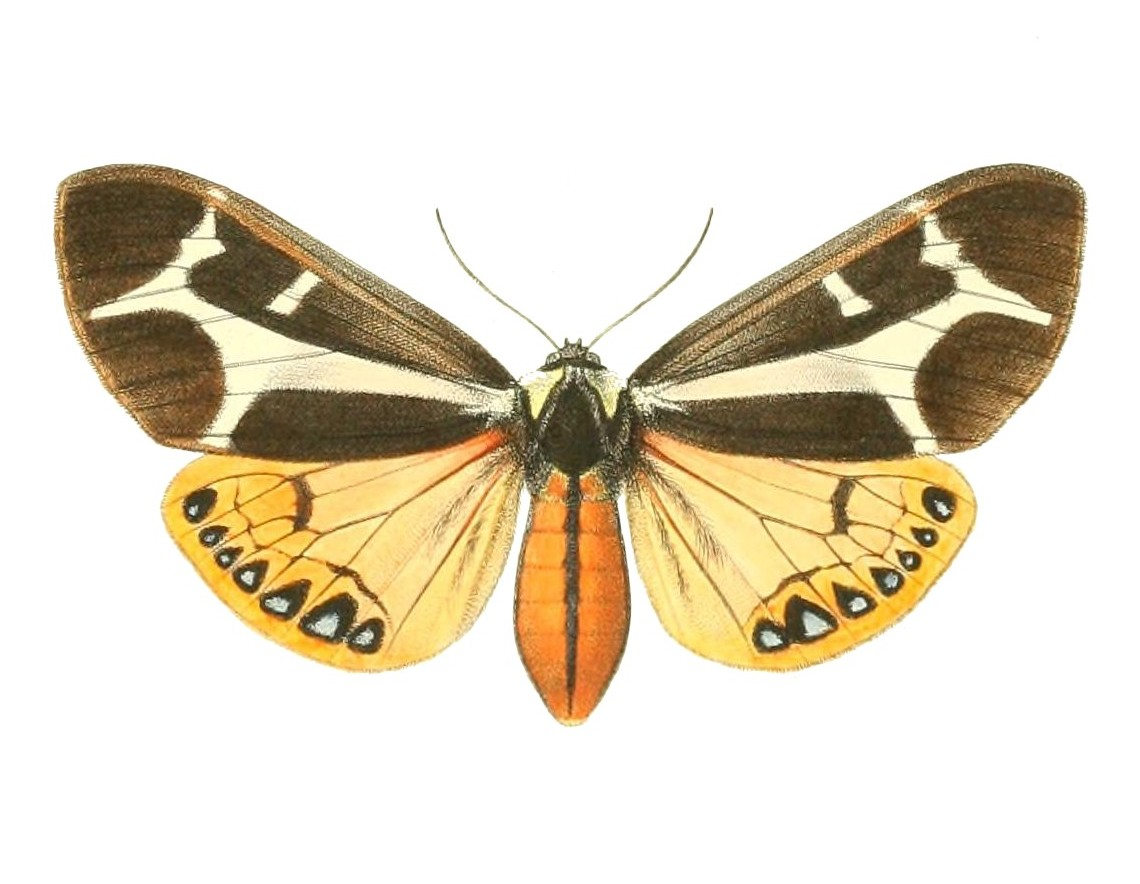
- Female
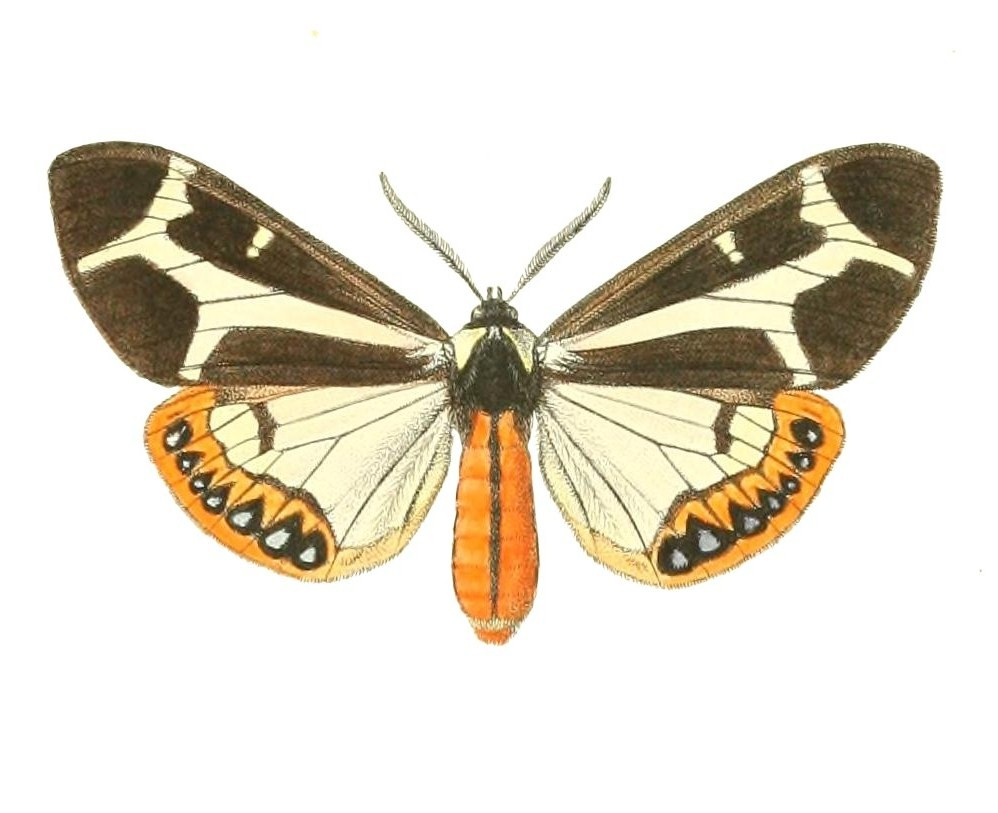
- Male

Scientific classification
- Kingdom: Animalia
- Phylum: Arthropoda
- Class: Insecta
- Order: Lepidoptera
- Superfamily: Noctuoidea
- Family: Erebidae
- Subfamily: Arctiinae
- Genus: Dysschema
- Species: D. mariamne

Binomial name
- Dysschema mariamne (Geyer, [1835])

Synonyms
- Eucharia mariamne Geyer, [1835]; Pericopis mariamne f. fenestrata Butler, 1872; Pericopis fenestrata Butler, 1872; Daritis fenestrata; Pericopis fenestrata

= Dysschema mariamne =

Species of moth

Dysschema mariamne is a moth of the family Erebidae first described by Warren in 1904. It is found in Mexico and Guatemala.
