= Dysschema superior =

Scientific classification
- Domain: Eukaryota
- Kingdom: Animalia
- Phylum: Arthropoda
- Class: Insecta
- Order: Lepidoptera
- Superfamily: Noctuoidea
- Family: Erebidae
- Subfamily: Arctiinae
- Genus: Dysschema
- Species: D. superior

Binomial name
- Dysschema superior (Jörgensen, 1934)

Synonyms
- Daritis superior Jörgensen, 1934

Species of moth

Dysschema superior is a moth of the family Erebidae. It was described by Peter Jörgensen in 1934. It is found in Paraguay.
