= Dysschema rorata =

Scientific classification
- Kingdom: Animalia
- Phylum: Arthropoda
- Clade: Pancrustacea
- Class: Insecta
- Order: Lepidoptera
- Superfamily: Noctuoidea
- Family: Erebidae
- Subfamily: Arctiinae
- Genus: Dysschema
- Species: D. rorata

Binomial name
- Dysschema rorata (Walker, [1865])

Synonyms
- Pericopis rorata Walker, [1865]

Species of moth

Dysschema rorata is a moth of the family Erebidae. It was described by Francis Walker in 1865. It is found in Colombia.
