= Ephelis sudanalis =

Scientific classification
- Domain: Eukaryota
- Kingdom: Animalia
- Phylum: Arthropoda
- Class: Insecta
- Order: Lepidoptera
- Family: Crambidae
- Genus: Ephelis
- Species: E. sudanalis

Binomial name
- Ephelis sudanalis (Zerny in Rebel & Zerny, 1917)

Synonyms
- Endolophia sudanalis Zerny in Rebel & Zerny, 1917; Emprepes sudanalis

Species of moth

Ephelis sudanalis is a moth in the family Crambidae. It is found in Sudan.
