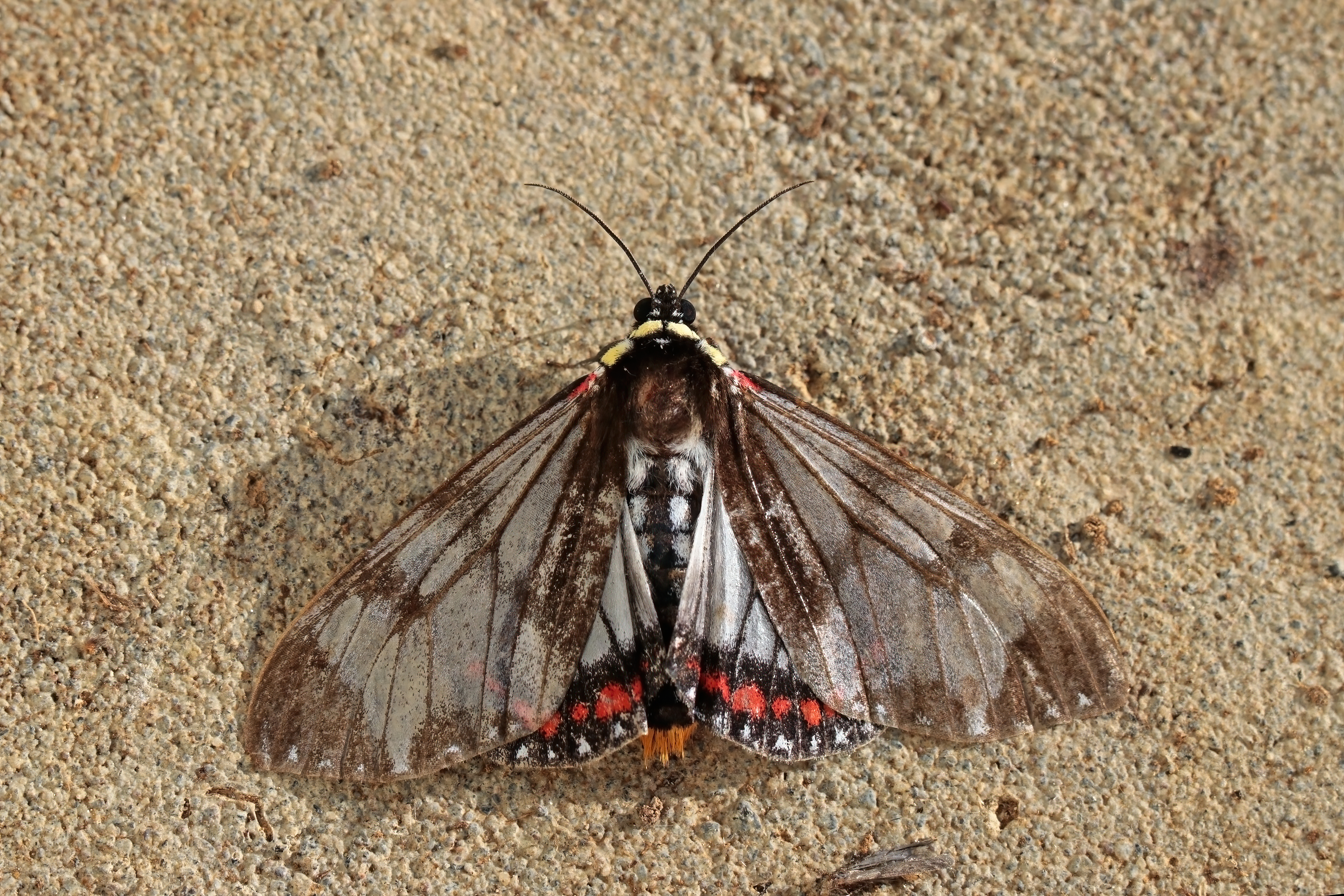
- D. cerialis, Panama

Scientific classification
- Kingdom: Animalia
- Phylum: Arthropoda
- Clade: Pancrustacea
- Class: Insecta
- Order: Lepidoptera
- Superfamily: Noctuoidea
- Family: Erebidae
- Subfamily: Arctiinae
- Subtribe: Pericopina
- Genus: Dysschema; Hübner, 1818

Synonyms
- Addua Walker, 1862; Ambryllis Walker, 1855; Aphisaon Boisduval, 1870; Daritis Walker, 1855; Pericopis Hübner, 1819; Thebrone Boisduval, 1870; Hyelosia Hubner, 1818; Taxila Walker, 1855; Coborisa Walker, 1855; Dorimena Boisduval, 1870

= Dysschema =

Genus of moths

Dysschema is a genus of tiger moths in the family Erebidae. The genus was erected by Jacob Hübner in 1818. The genus contains some of the more showy moths of the southwestern United States.

== Species ==
- Dysschema amphissum
- Dysschema arema
- Dysschema boisduvalii
- Dysschema brunnea
- Dysschema buckleyi
- Dysschema centenaria
- Dysschema centenarium
- Dysschema cerialis
- Dysschema constans
- Dysschema dissimulata
- Dysschema eurocilia
- Dysschema fanatica
- Dysschema fantasma
- Dysschema fenestrata
- Dysschema flavopennis
- Dysschema forbesi
- Dysschema formosissima
- Dysschema hilarum
- Dysschema humeralis
- Dysschema hyalinipennis
- Dysschema innominatum
- Dysschema intermedium
- Dysschema jansonis
- Dysschema larvata
- Dysschema leda
- Dysschema leucophaea
- Dysschema luctuosum
- Dysschema lunifera
- Dysschema lycaste
- Dysschema lygdamis
- Dysschema magdala
- Dysschema marginalis
- Dysschema marginata
- Dysschema mariamne
- Dysschema minor
- Dysschema modesta
- Dysschema montezuma
- Dysschema moseroides
- Dysschema neda
- Dysschema on
- Dysschema palmeri
- Dysschema perplexum
- Dysschema pictum
- Dysschema porioni
- Dysschema practides
- Dysschema practidoides
- Dysschema rorata
- Dysschema rosina
- Dysschema sacrifica
- Dysschema salome
- Dysschema schadei
- Dysschema semirufa
- Dysschema subapicalis
- Dysschema superior
- Dysschema terminata
- Dysschema thetis
- Dysschema thyridinum
- Dysschema tricolora
- Dysschema umbra
- Dysschema unifascia
- Dysschema viuda
- Dysschema zeladon
