= Ephelis maesi =

Scientific classification
- Kingdom: Animalia
- Phylum: Arthropoda
- Clade: Pancrustacea
- Class: Insecta
- Order: Lepidoptera
- Family: Crambidae
- Genus: Ephelis
- Species: E. maesi

Binomial name
- Ephelis maesi (Mey, 2011)

Synonyms
- Emprepes maesi Mey, 2011

Species of moth

Ephelis maesi is a moth in the family Crambidae. It was described by Wolfram Mey in 2011. It is found in Namibia, South Africa and Zimbabwe.
