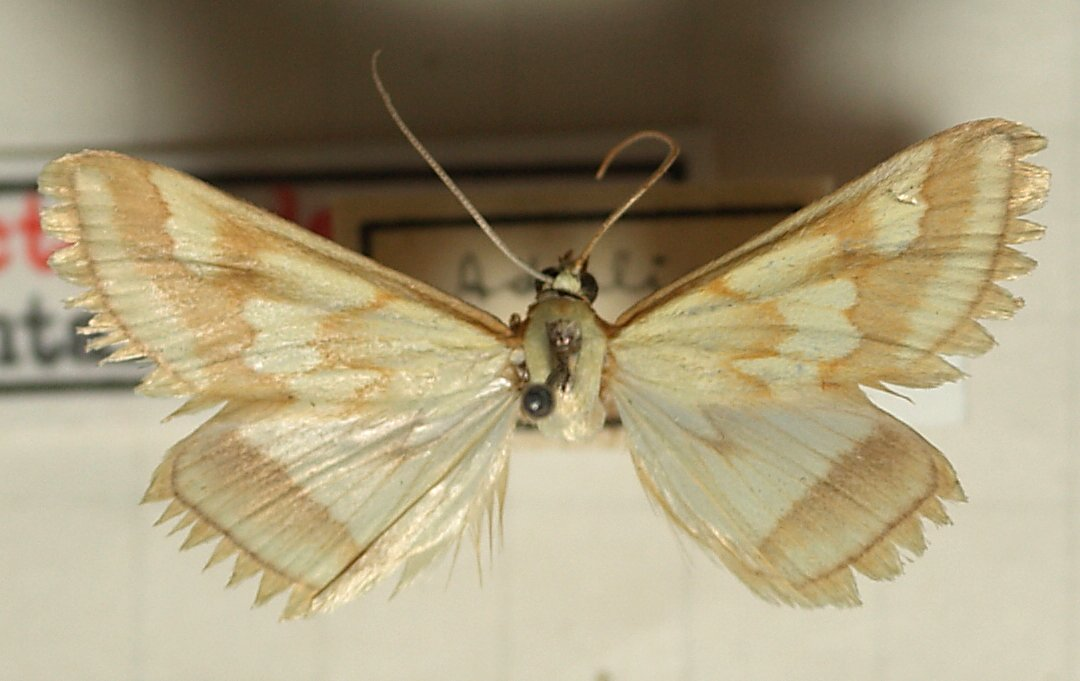
- Ephelis cruentalis

Scientific classification
- Kingdom: Animalia
- Phylum: Arthropoda
- Clade: Pancrustacea
- Class: Insecta
- Order: Lepidoptera
- Family: Crambidae
- Subfamily: Odontiinae
- Tribe: Odontiini
- Genus: Ephelis; Lederer, 1863

Synonyms
- Emprepes Lederer, 1863; Hammocallos Chrétien, 1908

= Ephelis (moth) =

Genus of moths

Ephelis is a genus of moths of the family Crambidae.

== Species in Ephelis ==
- Ephelis belutschistanalis (Amsel, 1961)
- Ephelis brabanti (Chrétien, 1908)
- Ephelis chirazalis (Amsel, 1949)
- Ephelis cruentalis (Geyer in Hübner, 1832)
- Ephelis flavomarginalis (Amsel, 1951)
- Ephelis maesi (Mey, 2011)
- Ephelis palealis (Amsel, 1949)
- Ephelis pudicalis (Duponchel, 1832)
- Ephelis robustalis (Amsel, 1970)
- Ephelis sudanalis (Zerny in Rebel & Zerny, 1917)
