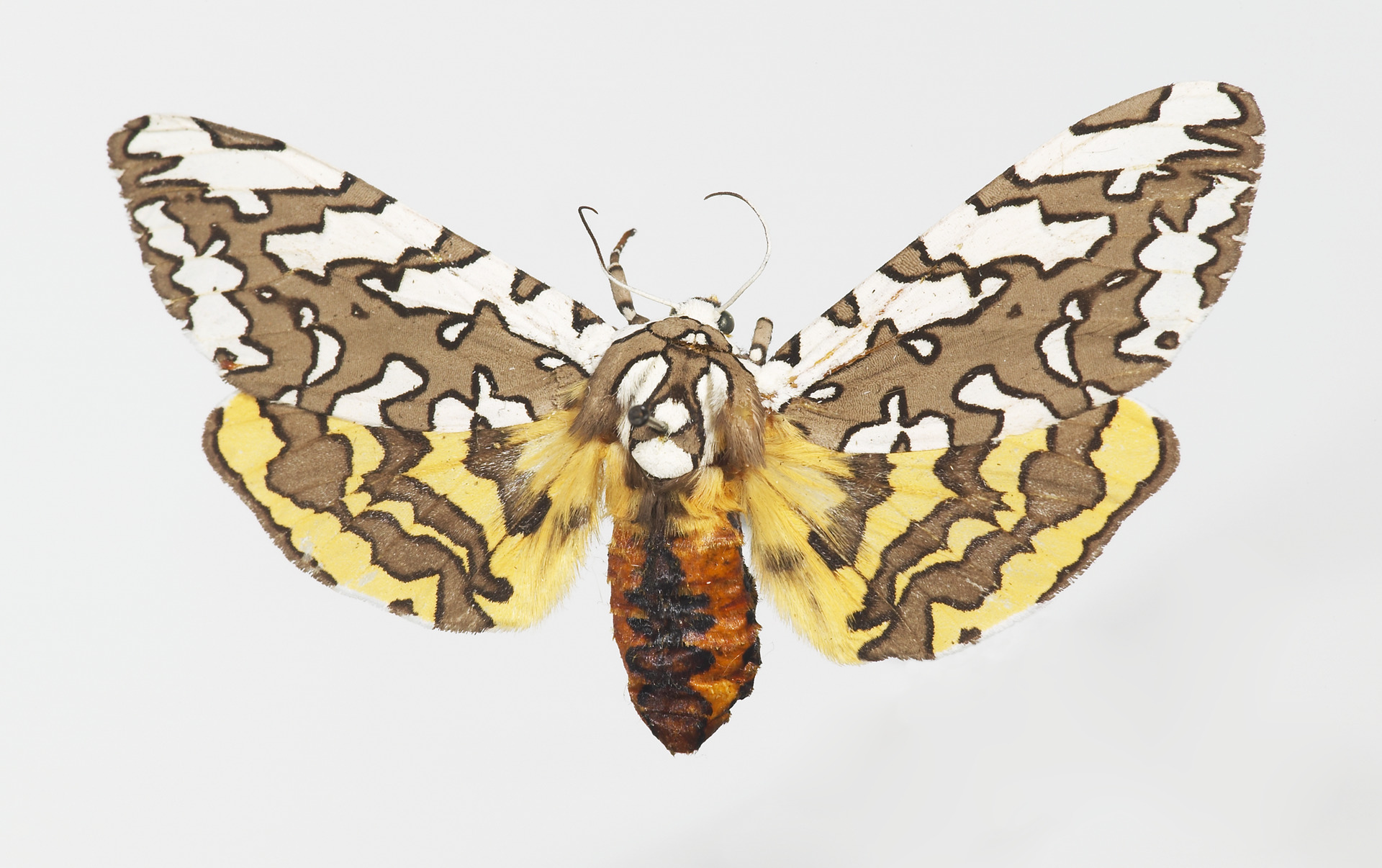

Scientific classification
- Domain: Eukaryota
- Kingdom: Animalia
- Phylum: Arthropoda
- Class: Insecta
- Order: Lepidoptera
- Superfamily: Noctuoidea
- Family: Erebidae
- Subfamily: Arctiinae
- Genus: Arachnis
- Species: A. zuni

Binomial name
- Arachnis zuni Neumoegen, 1890

= Arachnis zuni =

Species of moth

Arachnis zuni, the zuni tiger-moth, is a moth of the family Erebidae. It was described by Berthold Neumoegen in 1890. It is found in North America from New Mexico to Arizona and Mexico.
