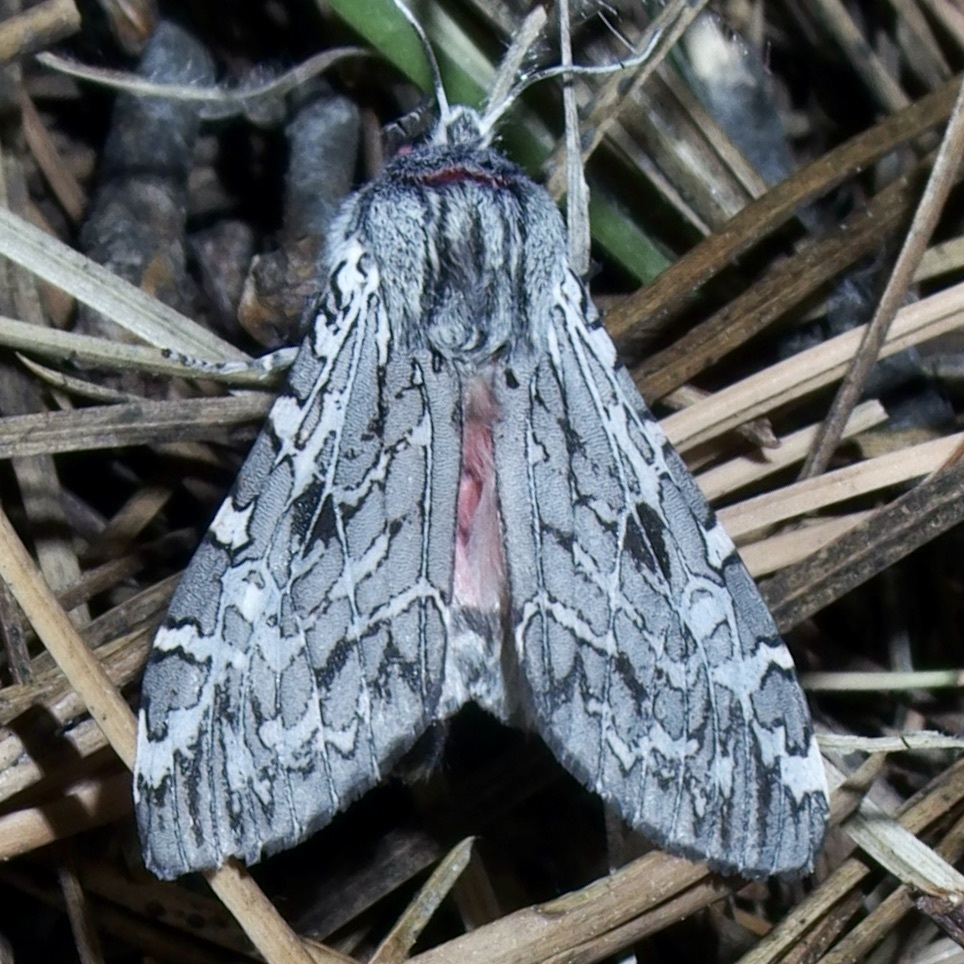

Scientific classification
- Kingdom: Animalia
- Phylum: Arthropoda
- Clade: Pancrustacea
- Class: Insecta
- Order: Lepidoptera
- Superfamily: Noctuoidea
- Family: Erebidae
- Subfamily: Arctiinae
- Genus: Arachnis
- Species: A. nedyma

Binomial name
- Arachnis nedyma Franclemont, 1966

= Arachnis nedyma =

Species of moth

Arachnis nedyma is a moth of the family Erebidae. It was described by John G. Franclemont in 1966. It is found in the US states of New Mexico and Arizona.
