= Dysschema on =

Scientific classification
- Domain: Eukaryota
- Kingdom: Animalia
- Phylum: Arthropoda
- Class: Insecta
- Order: Lepidoptera
- Superfamily: Noctuoidea
- Family: Erebidae
- Subfamily: Arctiinae
- Genus: Dysschema
- Species: D. on

Binomial name
- Dysschema on (Hering, 1928)

Synonyms
- Pericopis on Hering, 1928

Species of moth

Dysschema on is a moth of the family Erebidae. It was described by Hering in 1928. It is found in Brazil.
