= Ephelis belutschistanalis =

Scientific classification
- Domain: Eukaryota
- Kingdom: Animalia
- Phylum: Arthropoda
- Class: Insecta
- Order: Lepidoptera
- Family: Crambidae
- Genus: Ephelis
- Species: E. belutschistanalis

Binomial name
- Ephelis belutschistanalis (Amsel, 1961)

Synonyms
- Emprepes belutschistanalis Amsel, 1961

Species of moth

Ephelis belutschistanalis is a moth in the family Crambidae. It is found in Iran.
