= Spilomela receptalis =

Scientific classification
- Kingdom: Animalia
- Phylum: Arthropoda
- Clade: Pancrustacea
- Class: Insecta
- Order: Lepidoptera
- Family: Crambidae
- Genus: Spilomela
- Species: S. receptalis

Binomial name
- Spilomela receptalis (Walker, 1859)

Synonyms
- Zebronia receptalis Walker, 1859; Zebronia semizebralis Walker, 1866

Species of moth

Spilomela receptalis is a moth in the family Crambidae. It is found in Brazil (Parà) and Colombia.
