= Arachnis martina =

Scientific classification
- Domain: Eukaryota
- Kingdom: Animalia
- Phylum: Arthropoda
- Class: Insecta
- Order: Lepidoptera
- Superfamily: Noctuoidea
- Family: Erebidae
- Subfamily: Arctiinae
- Genus: Arachnis
- Species: A. martina

Binomial name
- Arachnis martina H. Druce, 1897

Species of moth

Arachnis martina is a moth of the family Erebidae. It was described by Herbert Druce in 1897. It is found in Mexico.
