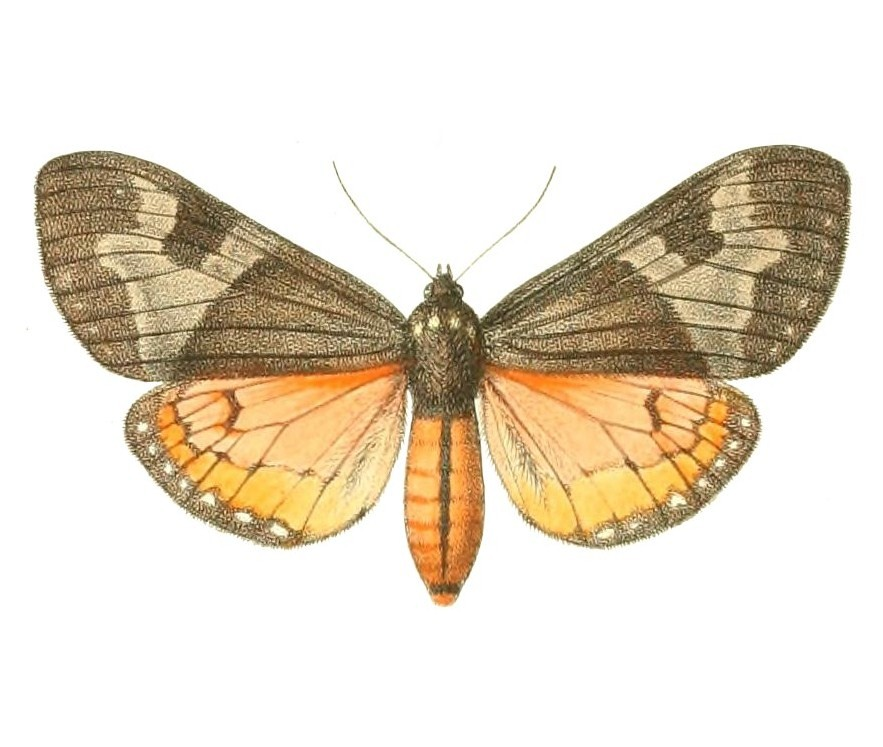

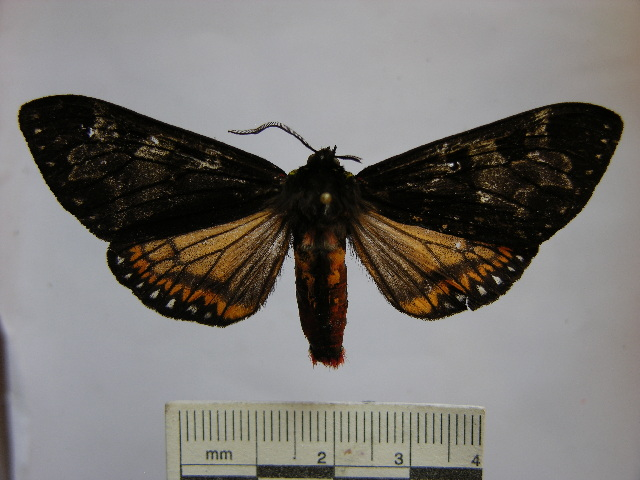

Scientific classification
- Kingdom: Animalia
- Phylum: Arthropoda
- Class: Insecta
- Order: Lepidoptera
- Superfamily: Noctuoidea
- Family: Erebidae
- Subfamily: Arctiinae
- Genus: Dysschema
- Species: D. lycaste

Binomial name
- Dysschema lycaste (Klug, 1836)

Synonyms
- Euprepia lycaste Klug, 1836; Chetone iscariotes Boisduval, 1870; Pericopis tibesis Druce, 1884; Pericopis f. cydon Druce, 1894; Pericopis f. praetides Druce, 1894; Pericopis lycaste

= Dysschema lycaste =

Species of moth

Dysschema lycaste is a moth of the family Erebidae first described by Johann Christoph Friedrich Klug in 1836. It is found in Mexico, Guatemala, Honduras and Costa Rica.
