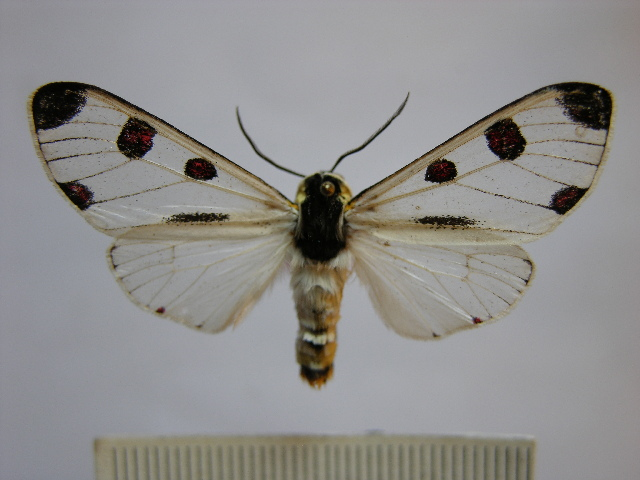

Scientific classification
- Domain: Eukaryota
- Kingdom: Animalia
- Phylum: Arthropoda
- Class: Insecta
- Order: Lepidoptera
- Superfamily: Noctuoidea
- Family: Erebidae
- Subfamily: Arctiinae
- Genus: Dysschema
- Species: D. boisduvalii

Binomial name
- Dysschema boisduvalii (Hoeven, 1840)

Synonyms
- Glaucopis boisduvalii Hoeven, 1840; Pericopis principalis Jörgensen, 1935; Dysschema principalis; Pericopis regalis Jörgensen, 1935; Dysschema regalis; Pericopis rubripicta Butler, 1872; Daritis trapeziata Walker, 1854; Dysschema trapeziata; Pericopis trapeziata; Mazaeras woodii Butler, 1867; Arctia funeralis Herrich-Schäffer, [1856]; Dysschema boisduvallii (Hoeven, 1840)

= Dysschema boisduvalii =

Species of moth

Dysschema boisduvalii is a moth of the family Erebidae first described by Jan van der Hoeven in 1840. It is found in Paraguay, Colombia, Brazil and Argentina.

Adults are sexually dimorphic.

The larvae feed on the leaves of Vernonia species.
