= Ephelis chirazalis =

Scientific classification
- Domain: Eukaryota
- Kingdom: Animalia
- Phylum: Arthropoda
- Class: Insecta
- Order: Lepidoptera
- Family: Crambidae
- Genus: Ephelis
- Species: E. chirazalis

Binomial name
- Ephelis chirazalis (Amsel, 1949)

Synonyms
- Emprepes chirazalis Amsel, 1949

Species of moth

Ephelis chirazalis is a moth in the family Crambidae. It is found in Iran.
