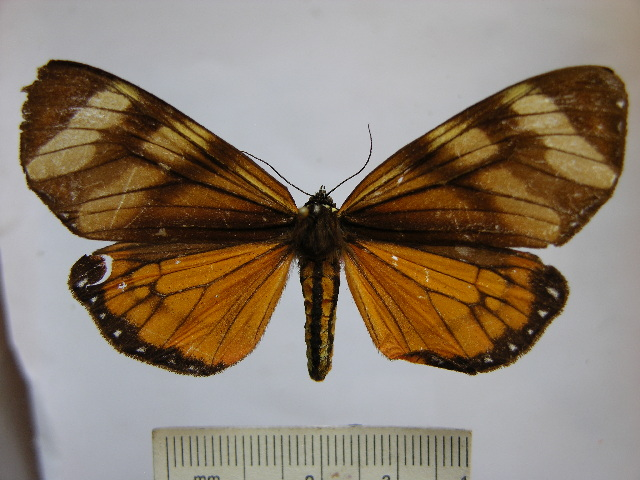

Scientific classification
- Domain: Eukaryota
- Kingdom: Animalia
- Phylum: Arthropoda
- Class: Insecta
- Order: Lepidoptera
- Superfamily: Noctuoidea
- Family: Erebidae
- Subfamily: Arctiinae
- Genus: Dysschema
- Species: D. eurocilia

Binomial name
- Dysschema eurocilia (Cramer, 1777)

Synonyms
- Phalaena eurocilia Cramer, 1777; Pericopis anadema Druce, 1907; Dysschema anadema; Chetone aorsa Boisduval, 1870; Dysschema aorsa; Pericopis bivittata Walker, 1854; Dysschema bivittata; Pericopis daphne Druce, 1885; Dysschema daphne; Pericopis disjuncta Walker, 1856; Pericopis flavimedia Monte, 1933; Dysschema flavimedia; Pericopis fulgorata Butler, 1871; Dysschema fulgorata; Dysschema hypoxantha Hübner, 1818; Pericopis leonina Butler, 1872; Dysschema leonina; Sericaria leptoptera Perty, [1833]; Dysschema leptoptera; Pericopis molesta Hering, 1925; Pericopis nigrivenata Hering, 1925; Dysschema nigrivenata; Pericopis parviflava Hering, 1926; Dysschema parviflava; Pericopis postflava Hering, 1926; Dysschema postflava; Pericopis sibylla Butler, 1873; Pericopis unxia Druce, 1910; Dysschema unxia; Pericopis hodeva Druce, 1910; Dysschema hodeva; Pericopis heliconissa Strand, 1921; Dysschema heliconissa; Pericopis lucretia Butler, 1876; Dysschema lucretia; Pericopis eurocilia f. melaina Hering, 1925; Pericopis eurocilia f. obscurata Hering, 1925; Pericopis rhea Druce, 1910; Dysschema rhea; Pericopis irene f. splendidissima Hering, 1925; Dysschema irene; Pericopis staudingeri Druce, 1910; Phalaena zerbina Stoll, 1790; Pericopis melini Bryk, 1953; Dysschema hypoxantha melini

= Dysschema eurocilia =

Species of moth

Dysschema eurocilia is a moth of the family Erebidae first described by Pieter Cramer in 1777. It is a common species throughout tropical America, where it has been recorded from the Antilles, Central America (including Costa Rica, Panama and Guatemala) and South America (including Paraguay, Brazil, Suriname, Peru, Colombia, Venezuela and Ecuador).

It is a highly variable species, especially the females.

The larvae feed on the leaves of Vernonia species and Lepidaploa canescens.
