= Dysschema fanatica =

Scientific classification
- Domain: Eukaryota
- Kingdom: Animalia
- Phylum: Arthropoda
- Class: Insecta
- Order: Lepidoptera
- Superfamily: Noctuoidea
- Family: Erebidae
- Subfamily: Arctiinae
- Genus: Dysschema
- Species: D. fanatica

Binomial name
- Dysschema fanatica (Dognin, 1919)

Synonyms
- Pericopis fanatica Dognin, 1919

Species of moth

Dysschema fanatica is a moth of the family Erebidae. It was described by Paul Dognin in 1919. It is found in Colombia.
