= Spilomela =

Scientific classification
- Kingdom: Animalia
- Phylum: Arthropoda
- Class: Insecta
- Order: Lepidoptera
- Family: Crambidae
- Subfamily: Spilomelinae
- Genus: Spilomela; Guenée, 1854

Genus of moths

Spilomela is a genus of moths of the family Crambidae.

== Species ==
- Spilomela discordens Dyar, 1914
- Spilomela divaricata (Hampson, 1899)
- Spilomela minoralis Hampson, 1912
- Spilomela pantheralis (Geyer in Hübner, 1832)
- Spilomela personalis Herrich-Schäffer, 1871
- Spilomela perspicata (Fabricius, 1787)
- Spilomela pervialis Herrich-Schäffer, 1871
- Spilomela receptalis (Walker, 1859)
