= Dysschema constans =

Scientific classification
- Domain: Eukaryota
- Kingdom: Animalia
- Phylum: Arthropoda
- Class: Insecta
- Order: Lepidoptera
- Superfamily: Noctuoidea
- Family: Erebidae
- Subfamily: Arctiinae
- Genus: Dysschema
- Species: D. constans

Binomial name
- Dysschema constans (Hering, 1925)

Synonyms
- Pericopis constans Hering, 1925

Species of moth

Dysschema constans is a moth of the family Erebidae. It was described by Hering in 1925. It is found in Brazil.
