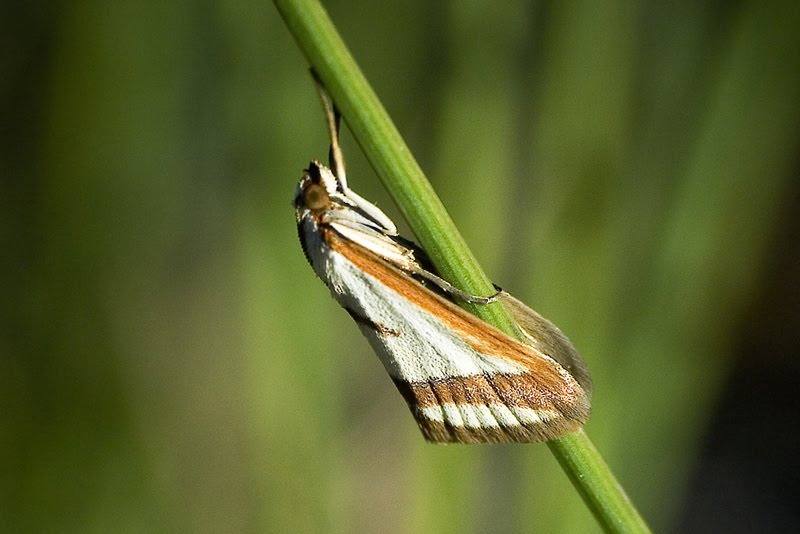

Scientific classification
- Domain: Eukaryota
- Kingdom: Animalia
- Phylum: Arthropoda
- Class: Insecta
- Order: Lepidoptera
- Family: Crambidae
- Genus: Ephelis
- Species: E. pudicalis

Binomial name
- Ephelis pudicalis (Duponchel, 1832)

Synonyms
- Pyrausta pudicalis Duponchel, 1832; Emprepes pudicalis

= Ephelis pudicalis =

Species of moth

Ephelis pudicalis is a species of moth in the family Crambidae. It is found in France and Spain.
