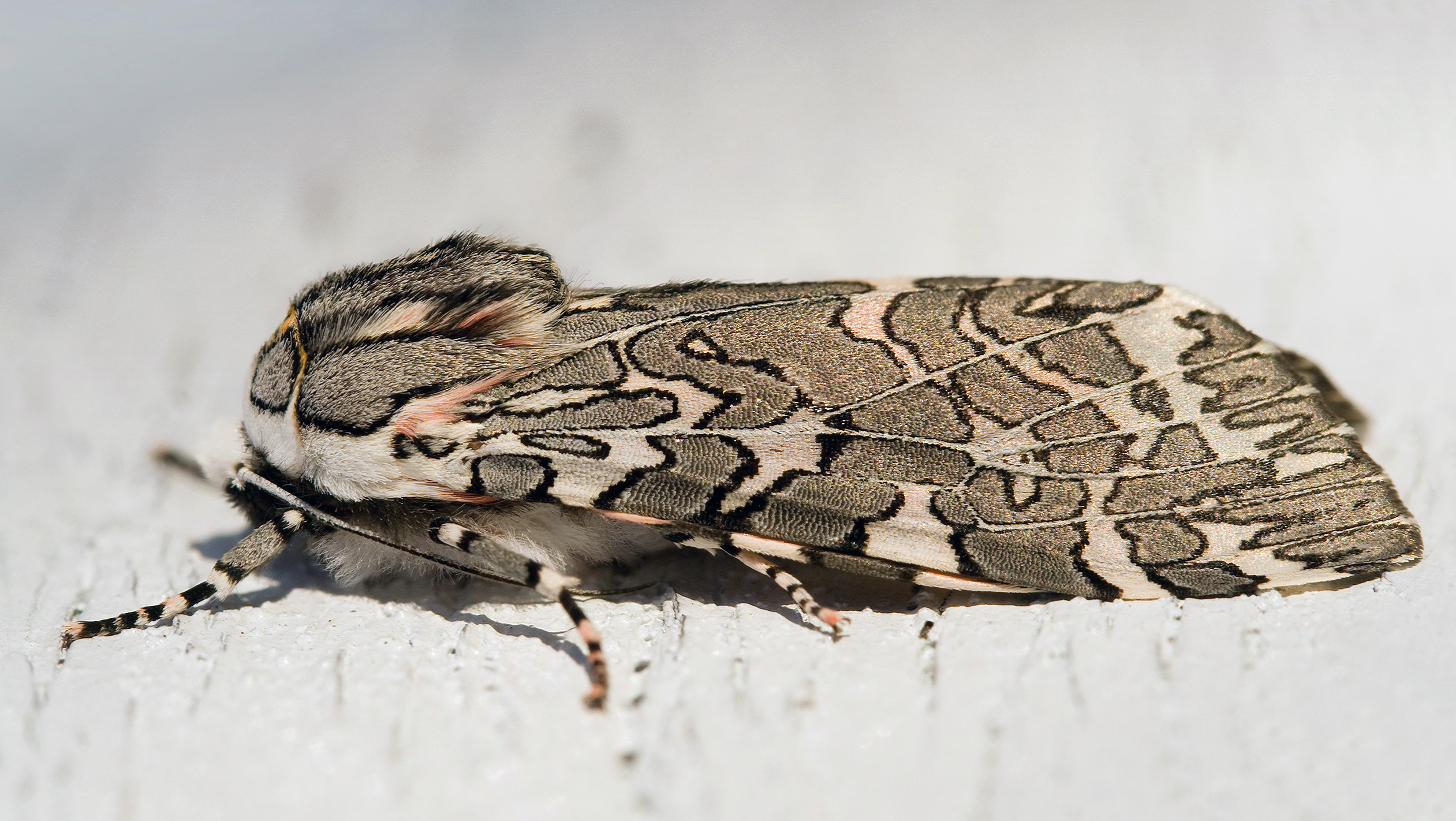
- A painted arachnis (Arachnis picta) found near Crestone, Colorado

Scientific classification
- Domain: Eukaryota
- Kingdom: Animalia
- Phylum: Arthropoda
- Class: Insecta
- Order: Lepidoptera
- Superfamily: Noctuoidea
- Family: Erebidae
- Subfamily: Arctiinae
- Subtribe: Spilosomina
- Genus: Arachnis; Geyer, 1837

Type species
- Arachnis aulaea Geyer, 1837

= Arachnis (moth) =

Genus of moths

Arachnis is a genus of moths in the subfamily Arctiinae, subfamily Arctiinae. The genus was erected by Carl Geyer in 1837.

== Species ==
- Arachnis aulaea Geyer, 1837
- Arachnis citra Neumögen & Dyar, 1893 (syn: Arachnis apachea Clarke, 1941)
- Arachnis dilecta (Boisduval, 1870)
- Arachnis martina H. Druce, 1897
- Arachnis midas Barnes & Lindsey, 1921
- Arachnis mishma H. Druce, 1897
- Arachnis nedyma Franclemont, 1966
- Arachnis picta Packard, 1864
- Arachnis tristis Rothschild, 1935
- Arachnis zuni Neumoegen, 1890
