= Dysschema larvata =

Scientific classification
- Kingdom: Animalia
- Phylum: Arthropoda
- Class: Insecta
- Order: Lepidoptera
- Superfamily: Noctuoidea
- Family: Erebidae
- Subfamily: Arctiinae
- Genus: Dysschema
- Species: D. larvata

Binomial name
- Dysschema larvata (Walker, 1856)

Synonyms
- Pericopis larvata Walker, 1856

Species of moth

Dysschema larvata is a moth of the family Erebidae. It was described by Francis Walker in 1856. It is found in Brazil.
