= Dysschema formosissima =

Scientific classification
- Domain: Eukaryota
- Kingdom: Animalia
- Phylum: Arthropoda
- Class: Insecta
- Order: Lepidoptera
- Superfamily: Noctuoidea
- Family: Erebidae
- Subfamily: Arctiinae
- Genus: Dysschema
- Species: D. formosissima

Binomial name
- Dysschema formosissima (Butler, 1871)

Synonyms
- Pericopis formosissima Butler, 1871

Species of moth

Dysschema formosissima is a moth of the family Erebidae. It was described by Arthur Gardiner Butler in 1871. It is found in Colombia and Ecuador.
