= Ephelis robustalis =

Scientific classification
- Domain: Eukaryota
- Kingdom: Animalia
- Phylum: Arthropoda
- Class: Insecta
- Order: Lepidoptera
- Family: Crambidae
- Genus: Ephelis
- Species: E. robustalis

Binomial name
- Ephelis robustalis Amsel, 1970

Species of moth

Ephelis robustalis is a moth in the family Crambidae. It was described by Hans Georg Amsel in 1970. It is found in Afghanistan.
