= Dysschema pictum =

Scientific classification
- Kingdom: Animalia
- Phylum: Arthropoda
- Clade: Pancrustacea
- Class: Insecta
- Order: Lepidoptera
- Superfamily: Noctuoidea
- Family: Erebidae
- Subfamily: Arctiinae
- Genus: Dysschema
- Species: D. pictum

Binomial name
- Dysschema pictum (Guérin-Méneville, [1844])

Synonyms
- Callimorpha pictum Guérin-Méneville, [1844]; Dysschema picta; Pericopis capella Druce, 1899; Pericopis indecisa Walker, 1854; Pericopis lucifer Butler, 1873; Dysschema lucifer

Species of moth

Dysschema pictum is a moth of the family Erebidae first described by Félix Édouard Guérin-Méneville in 1844. It is found in Brazil.

The larvae feed on the leaves of Mikania hirsutissima, Senecio brasiliensis and Vernonia polyanthes.
