= Dysschema hilara =

Scientific classification
- Kingdom: Animalia
- Phylum: Arthropoda
- Class: Insecta
- Order: Lepidoptera
- Superfamily: Noctuoidea
- Family: Erebidae
- Subfamily: Arctiinae
- Genus: Dysschema
- Species: D. hilara

Binomial name
- Dysschema hilara (Weymer, 1895)

Synonyms
- Thebrone hilarum Weymer, 1895; Dysschema hilarum; Pericopis biformis Schaus, 1901; Thebrone hilarina Weymer, 1914; Dysschema hilarina; Thebrone hilarina f. fulva Weymer, 1914; Pericopis hilara f. mutata Hering, 1925

Species of moth

Dysschema hilara is a moth of the family Erebidae first described by Gustav Weymer in 1895. It is found in Brazil.

It is a variable species.
