= Dysschema luctuosum =

Scientific classification
- Domain: Eukaryota
- Kingdom: Animalia
- Phylum: Arthropoda
- Class: Insecta
- Order: Lepidoptera
- Superfamily: Noctuoidea
- Family: Erebidae
- Subfamily: Arctiinae
- Genus: Dysschema
- Species: D. luctuosum

Binomial name
- Dysschema luctuosum (Dognin, 1919)

Synonyms
- Pericopis luctuosum Dognin, 1919; Dysschema luctuosa; Pericopis aethiops Hering, 1928; Dysschema aethiops

Species of moth

Dysschema luctuosum is a moth of the family Erebidae first described by Paul Dognin in 1919. It is found along the south-eastern coast of Brazil, from Rio de Janeiro to Santa Catarina.
