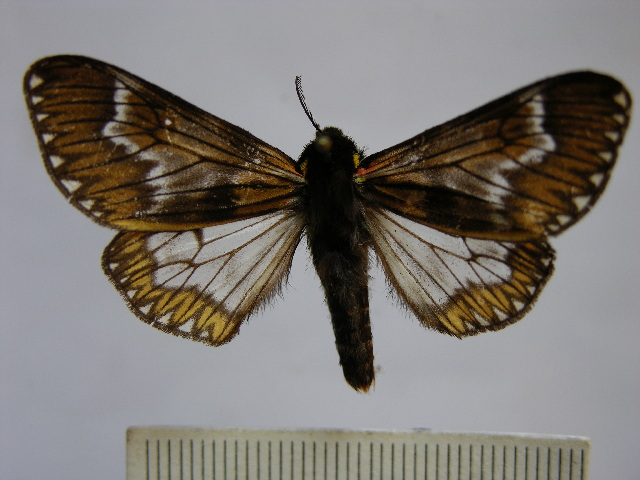

Scientific classification
- Domain: Eukaryota
- Kingdom: Animalia
- Phylum: Arthropoda
- Class: Insecta
- Order: Lepidoptera
- Superfamily: Noctuoidea
- Family: Erebidae
- Subfamily: Arctiinae
- Genus: Dysschema
- Species: D. practides

Binomial name
- Dysschema practides (H. Druce, 1911)

Synonyms
- Pericopis practides H. Druce, 1911

= Dysschema practides =

Species of moth

Dysschema practides is a moth of the family Erebidae first described by Herbert Druce in 1911. It is found in Colombia.
