= Dysschema fantasma =

Scientific classification
- Domain: Eukaryota
- Kingdom: Animalia
- Phylum: Arthropoda
- Class: Insecta
- Order: Lepidoptera
- Superfamily: Noctuoidea
- Family: Erebidae
- Subfamily: Arctiinae
- Genus: Dysschema
- Species: D. fantasma

Binomial name
- Dysschema fantasma (Butler, 1873)

Synonyms
- Pericopis fantasma Butler, 1873

Species of moth

Dysschema fantasma is a moth of the family Erebidae first described by Arthur Gardiner Butler in 1873. It is found in south-eastern Brazil.
