= Dysschema marginata =

Scientific classification
- Kingdom: Animalia
- Phylum: Arthropoda
- Clade: Pancrustacea
- Class: Insecta
- Order: Lepidoptera
- Superfamily: Noctuoidea
- Family: Erebidae
- Subfamily: Arctiinae
- Genus: Dysschema
- Species: D. marginata

Binomial name
- Dysschema marginata (Guérin-Méneville, [1844])

Synonyms
- Callimorpha marginata Guérin-Méneville, [1844]

Species of moth

Dysschema marginata is a moth of the family Erebidae. It was described by Félix Édouard Guérin-Méneville in 1844. It is found in Brazil.
