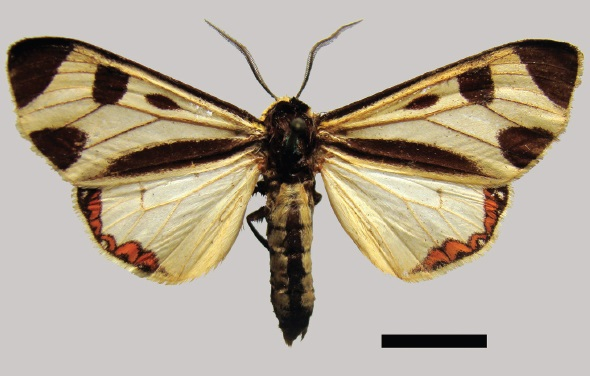

Scientific classification
- Kingdom: Animalia
- Phylum: Arthropoda
- Class: Insecta
- Order: Lepidoptera
- Superfamily: Noctuoidea
- Family: Erebidae
- Subfamily: Arctiinae
- Genus: Dysschema
- Species: D. centenaria

Binomial name
- Dysschema centenaria (Burmeister, 1878)

Synonyms
- Eucharia centenaria Burmeister, 1878; Pericopis f. obscura Hering, 1928

= Dysschema centenaria =

Species of moth

Dysschema centenaria is a moth of the family Erebidae. It was described by Hermann Burmeister in 1878. It is found in Argentina and Uruguay.
