= Dysschema umbra =

Scientific classification
- Domain: Eukaryota
- Kingdom: Animalia
- Phylum: Arthropoda
- Class: Insecta
- Order: Lepidoptera
- Superfamily: Noctuoidea
- Family: Erebidae
- Subfamily: Arctiinae
- Genus: Dysschema
- Species: D. umbra

Binomial name
- Dysschema umbra (H. Druce, 1885)

Synonyms
- Pericopis umbra H. Druce, 1885

Species of moth

Dysschema umbra is a moth of the family Erebidae. It was described by Herbert Druce in 1885. It is found in El Salvador.
