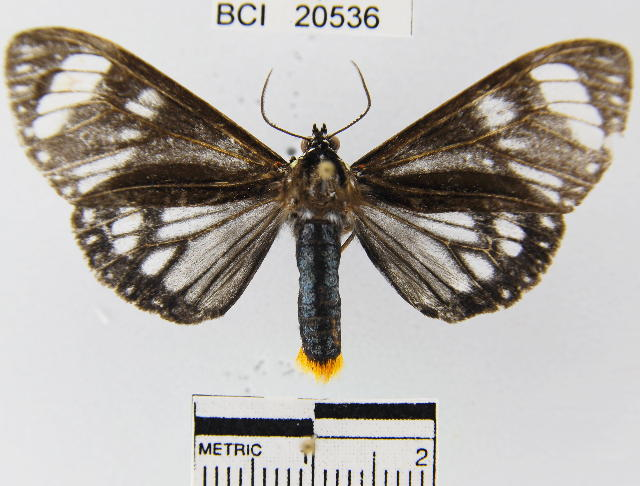

Scientific classification
- Domain: Eukaryota
- Kingdom: Animalia
- Phylum: Arthropoda
- Class: Insecta
- Order: Lepidoptera
- Superfamily: Noctuoidea
- Family: Erebidae
- Subfamily: Arctiinae
- Genus: Dysschema
- Species: D. perplexum

Binomial name
- Dysschema perplexum (Schaus, 1910)

Synonyms
- Pericopis perplexum Schaus, 1910; Dysschema perplexa; Pericopis guapa Schaus, 1910; Dysschema guapa

= Dysschema perplexum =

Species of moth

Dysschema perplexum is a moth of the family Erebidae first described by William Schaus in 1910. It is found in Panama and Costa Rica.
