= Spilomela discordens =

Scientific classification
- Kingdom: Animalia
- Phylum: Arthropoda
- Clade: Pancrustacea
- Class: Insecta
- Order: Lepidoptera
- Family: Crambidae
- Genus: Spilomela
- Species: S. discordens

Binomial name
- Spilomela discordens Dyar, 1914

Species of moth

Spilomela discordens is a moth in the family Crambidae. It is found in Panama, Costa Rica and Honduras.

The wingspan is about 21 mm. Adults are white, marked with brown.
