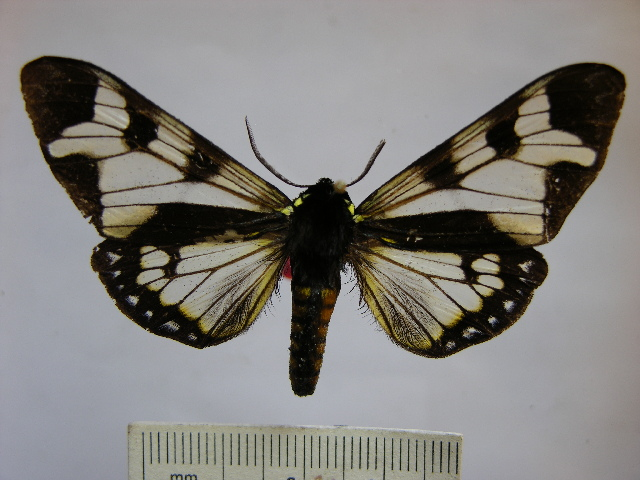

Scientific classification
- Kingdom: Animalia
- Phylum: Arthropoda
- Clade: Pancrustacea
- Class: Insecta
- Order: Lepidoptera
- Superfamily: Noctuoidea
- Family: Erebidae
- Subfamily: Arctiinae
- Genus: Dysschema
- Species: D. porioni

Binomial name
- Dysschema porioni (Gibeaux, 1982)

Synonyms
- Pericopis porioni Gibeaux, 1982

= Dysschema porioni =

Species of moth

Dysschema porioni is a moth of the family Erebidae first described by Christian Gibeaux in 1982. It is found in Peru.
