= Ephelis brabanti =

Scientific classification
- Domain: Eukaryota
- Kingdom: Animalia
- Phylum: Arthropoda
- Class: Insecta
- Order: Lepidoptera
- Family: Crambidae
- Genus: Ephelis
- Species: E. brabanti

Binomial name
- Ephelis brabanti (Chrétien, 1908)

Synonyms
- Hammocallos brabanti Chrétien, 1908; Emprepes brabanti

Species of moth

Ephelis brabanti is a moth in the family Crambidae. It is found in Algeria.
