= Dysschema terminata =

Scientific classification
- Kingdom: Animalia
- Phylum: Arthropoda
- Clade: Pancrustacea
- Class: Insecta
- Order: Lepidoptera
- Superfamily: Noctuoidea
- Family: Erebidae
- Subfamily: Arctiinae
- Genus: Dysschema
- Species: D. terminata

Binomial name
- Dysschema terminata (Guérin-Méneville, [1844])

Synonyms
- Callimorpha terminata Guérin-Méneville, [1844]; Pericopis holofernes Butler, 1871

Species of moth

Dysschema terminata is a moth of the family Erebidae. It was described by Félix Édouard Guérin-Méneville in 1844. It is found in Brazil.
