= Spilomela divaricata =

Scientific classification
- Kingdom: Animalia
- Phylum: Arthropoda
- Clade: Pancrustacea
- Class: Insecta
- Order: Lepidoptera
- Family: Crambidae
- Genus: Spilomela
- Species: S. divaricata

Binomial name
- Spilomela divaricata (Hampson, 1899)

Synonyms
- Entephria divaricata Hampson, 1899; Pycnarmon divaricata

Species of moth

Spilomela divaricata is a moth in the family Crambidae. It is found in Brazil (São Paulo).

The wingspan is about 26 mm. The forewings are pale fulvous with two subbasal dark lines. There is a small annulus in the cell with a line from it to the inner margin. There is also a discocellular reniform spot filled with fulvous and a strong black postmedial line, the area beyond it suffused with brown. The hindwings are paler, with a discocellular annulus and an ill-defined postmedial line, the area beyond it suffused with brown. Both wings have a dark marginal line.
