= Spilomela perspicata =

Scientific classification
- Kingdom: Animalia
- Phylum: Arthropoda
- Clade: Pancrustacea
- Class: Insecta
- Order: Lepidoptera
- Family: Crambidae
- Genus: Spilomela
- Species: S. perspicata

Binomial name
- Spilomela perspicata (Fabricius, 1787)

Synonyms
- Phalaena perspicata Fabricius, 1787; Palpita perspicalis Hübner, 1811; Phalaena strigialis Stoll, 1790; Phalaena stygialis Hampson, 1899

Species of moth

Spilomela perspicata is a moth in the family Crambidae. It is found in French Guiana, Suriname, Peru, Venezuela and Costa Rica.
