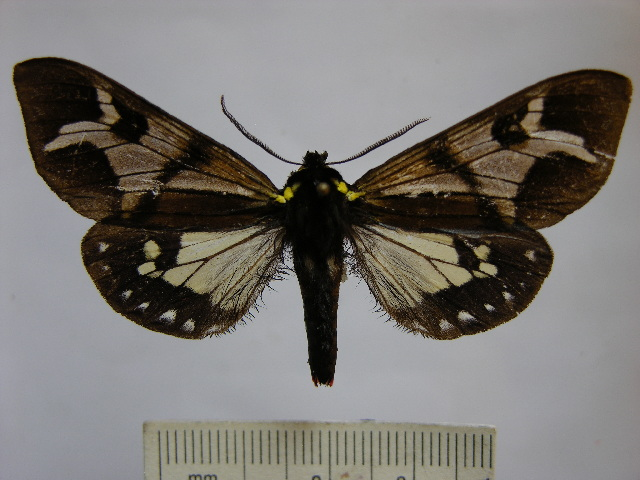

Scientific classification
- Domain: Eukaryota
- Kingdom: Animalia
- Phylum: Arthropoda
- Class: Insecta
- Order: Lepidoptera
- Superfamily: Noctuoidea
- Family: Erebidae
- Subfamily: Arctiinae
- Genus: Dysschema
- Species: D. arema

Binomial name
- Dysschema arema (Boisduval, 1870)

Synonyms
- Tebrone arema Boisduval, 1870; Pericopis imitata Druce, 1910; Pericopis titan Druce, 1910; Dysschema imitata; Dysschema titan

= Dysschema arema =

Species of moth

Dysschema arema is a moth of the family Erebidae first described by Jean Baptiste Boisduval in 1870. It is found in Nicaragua, Venezuela, Peru, Brazil and Ecuador.
