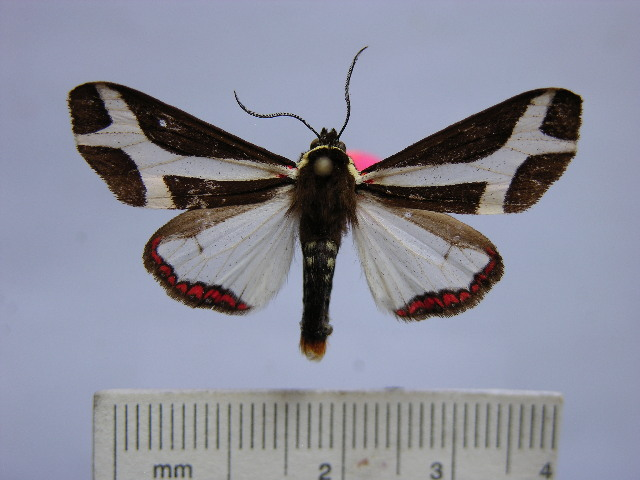

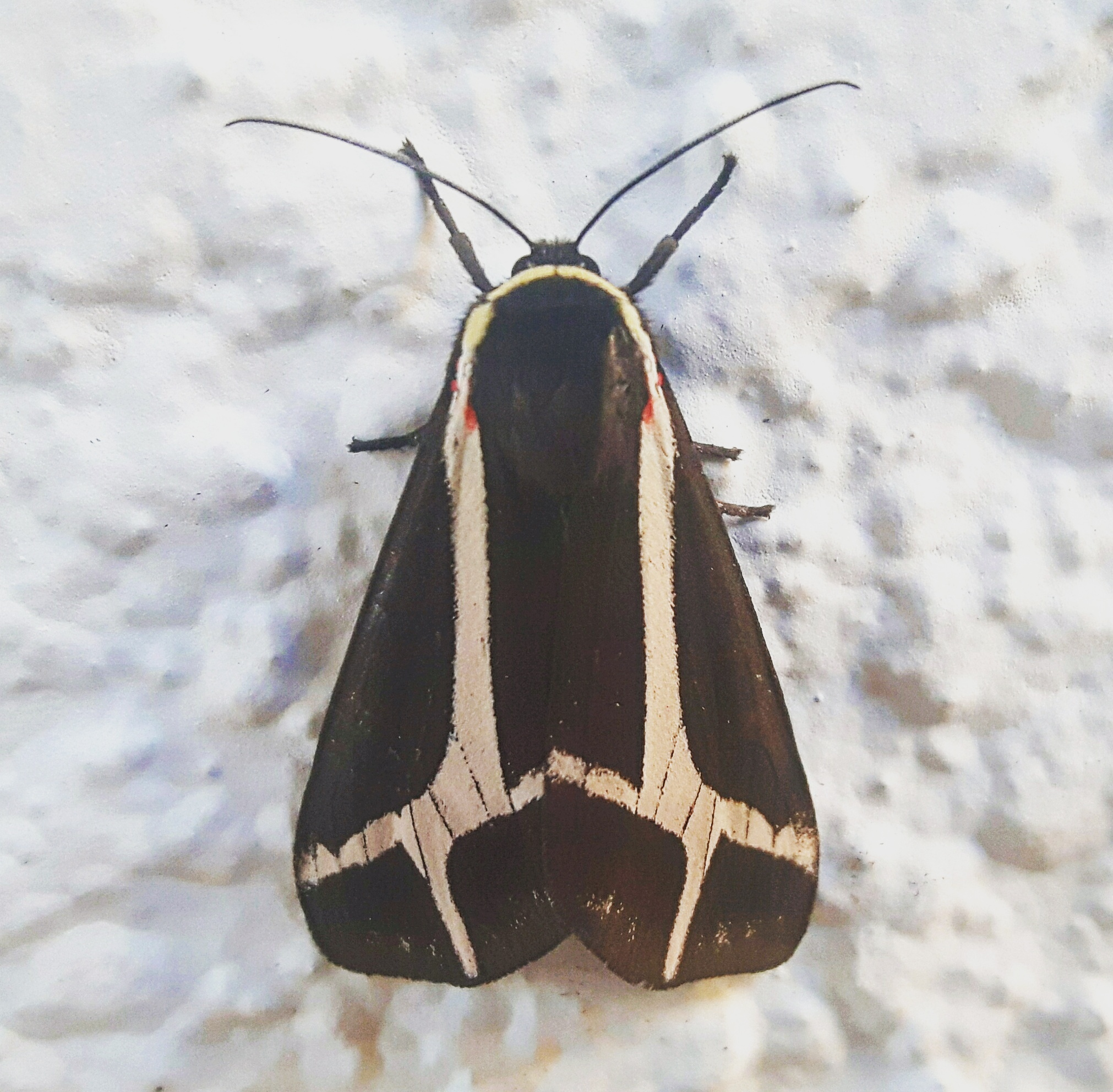

Scientific classification
- Kingdom: Animalia
- Phylum: Arthropoda
- Clade: Pancrustacea
- Class: Insecta
- Order: Lepidoptera
- Superfamily: Noctuoidea
- Family: Erebidae
- Subfamily: Arctiinae
- Genus: Dysschema
- Species: D. sacrifica

Binomial name
- Dysschema sacrifica (Hübner, [1831])

Synonyms
- Eucharia sacrifica Hübner, [1831]; Chelonia crucifera Perty, [1833]

= Dysschema sacrifica =

Species of moth

Dysschema sacrifica is a moth in the subfamily Arctiinae, of the family Erebidae. The species first described by Jacob Hübner in 1831. It is found in Brazil, Uruguay and Argentina.

In Spanish, this moth is called the mariposa tigre, a name it shares with the butterfly Danaus chrysippus.
