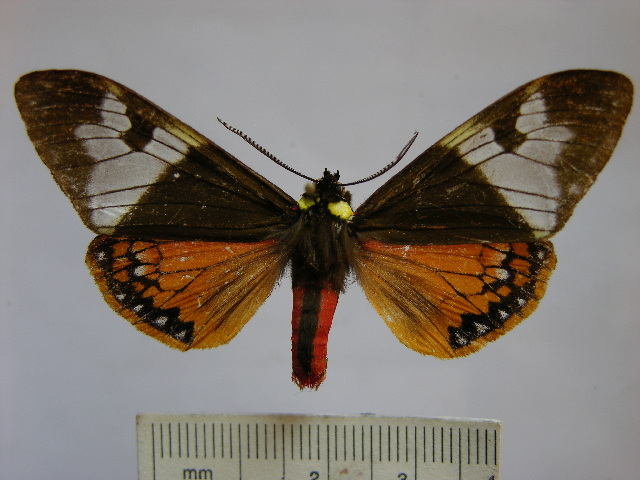

Scientific classification
- Domain: Eukaryota
- Kingdom: Animalia
- Phylum: Arthropoda
- Class: Insecta
- Order: Lepidoptera
- Superfamily: Noctuoidea
- Family: Erebidae
- Subfamily: Arctiinae
- Genus: Dysschema
- Species: D. zeladon

Binomial name
- Dysschema zeladon (Dyar, 1913)

Synonyms
- Pericopis zeladon Dyar, 1913

= Dysschema zeladon =

Species of moth

Dysschema zeladon is a moth of the family Erebidae first described by Harrison Gray Dyar Jr. in 1913. It is found in Mexico.
