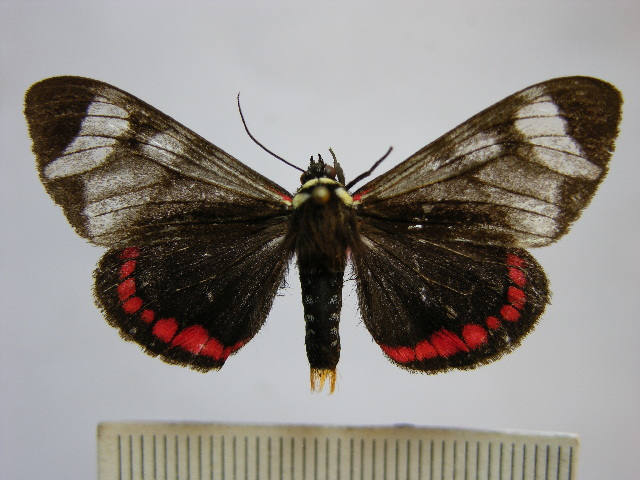

Scientific classification
- Kingdom: Animalia
- Phylum: Arthropoda
- Class: Insecta
- Order: Lepidoptera
- Superfamily: Noctuoidea
- Family: Erebidae
- Subfamily: Arctiinae
- Genus: Dysschema
- Species: D. leucophaea

Binomial name
- Dysschema leucophaea (Walker, 1854)

Synonyms
- Pericopis leucophaea Walker, 1854; Thebrone rubrimargo Boisduval, 1870; Aphisaon salvatoris Boisduval, 1870; Pericopis flora Butler, 1873

= Dysschema leucophaea =

Species of moth

Dysschema leucophaea is a moth of the family Erebidae first described by Francis Walker in 1854. It is found in Mexico, Honduras, Guatemala and Nicaragua.
