= Dysschema schadei =

Scientific classification
- Domain: Eukaryota
- Kingdom: Animalia
- Phylum: Arthropoda
- Class: Insecta
- Order: Lepidoptera
- Superfamily: Noctuoidea
- Family: Erebidae
- Subfamily: Arctiinae
- Genus: Dysschema
- Species: D. schadei

Binomial name
- Dysschema schadei (Schaus, 1927)

Synonyms
- Pericopis schadei Schaus, 1927

Species of moth

Dysschema schadei is a moth of the family Erebidae. It was described by Schaus in 1927. It is found in Paraguay.
