= Dysschema centenarium =

Scientific classification
- Kingdom: Animalia
- Phylum: Arthropoda
- Class: Insecta
- Order: Lepidoptera
- Superfamily: Noctuoidea
- Family: Erebidae
- Subfamily: Arctiinae
- Genus: Dysschema
- Species: D. centenarium

Binomial name
- Dysschema centenarium (Burmeister, 1879)

Synonyms
- Eucharia centenarium Burmeister, 1879; Pericopis jaonis Strand, 1911; Dysschema jaonis; Dysschema centenaria (Burmeister, 1878)

Species of moth

Dysschema centenarium is a moth of the family Erebidae first described by Hermann Burmeister in 1879. It is found from Argentina and Uruguay to southern Rio Grande do Sul in Brazil.

The larvae feed on the leaves of Eryngium paniculatum in Uruguay and Eryngium eburneum in Argentina.
