= Dysschema minor =

Scientific classification
- Domain: Eukaryota
- Kingdom: Animalia
- Phylum: Arthropoda
- Class: Insecta
- Order: Lepidoptera
- Superfamily: Noctuoidea
- Family: Erebidae
- Subfamily: Arctiinae
- Genus: Dysschema
- Species: D. minor

Binomial name
- Dysschema minor Becker, 2013

Species of moth

Dysschema minor is a moth of the family Erebidae first described by Vitor Osmar Becker in 2013. It is found in Mexico.

The length of the forewings is 26–28 mm (1.0–1.1 in) for males.

== Etymology ==
The species name is derived from Latin minor (meaning little).
