= Dysschema fenestrata =

Scientific classification
- Kingdom: Animalia
- Phylum: Arthropoda
- Class: Insecta
- Order: Lepidoptera
- Superfamily: Noctuoidea
- Family: Erebidae
- Subfamily: Arctiinae
- Genus: Dysschema
- Species: D. fenestrata

Binomial name
- Dysschema fenestrata (Walker, 1855)

Synonyms
- Coborisa fenestrata Walker, 1855

Species of moth

Dysschema fenestrata is a moth of the family Erebidae. It was described by Francis Walker in 1855. It is found in Mexico.
