= Dysschema jansonis =

Scientific classification
- Domain: Eukaryota
- Kingdom: Animalia
- Phylum: Arthropoda
- Class: Insecta
- Order: Lepidoptera
- Superfamily: Noctuoidea
- Family: Erebidae
- Subfamily: Arctiinae
- Genus: Dysschema
- Species: D. jansonis

Binomial name
- Dysschema jansonis (Butler, 1870)

Synonyms
- Pericopis jansonis Butler, 1870; Pericopis jansoni

Species of moth

Dysschema jansonis is a moth of the family Erebidae. It was described by Arthur Gardiner Butler in 1870. It is found in Nicaragua.
