= Dysschema innominatum =

Scientific classification
- Domain: Eukaryota
- Kingdom: Animalia
- Phylum: Arthropoda
- Class: Insecta
- Order: Lepidoptera
- Superfamily: Noctuoidea
- Family: Erebidae
- Subfamily: Arctiinae
- Genus: Dysschema
- Species: D. innominatum

Binomial name
- Dysschema innominatum Becker, 2013

Species of moth

Dysschema innominatum is a moth of the family Erebidae first described by Vitor Osmar Becker in 2013. It is restricted to southern Brazil, ranging from northern Rio Grande do Sul, to the mountains of Rio de Janeiro.

The length of the forewings is 22–25 mm for males.

== Etymology ==
The species name is derived from Latin innominatus (meaning nameless).
