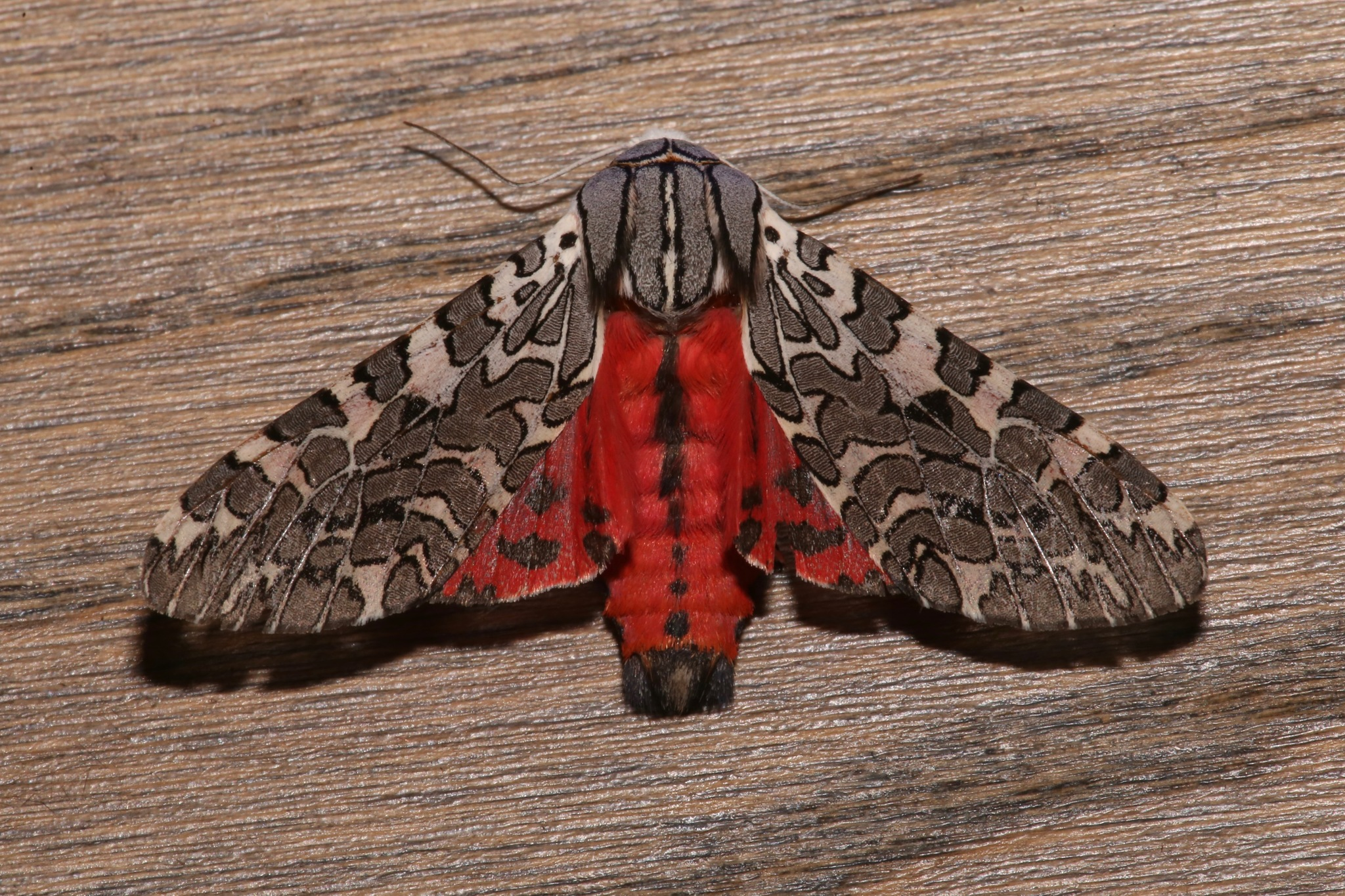

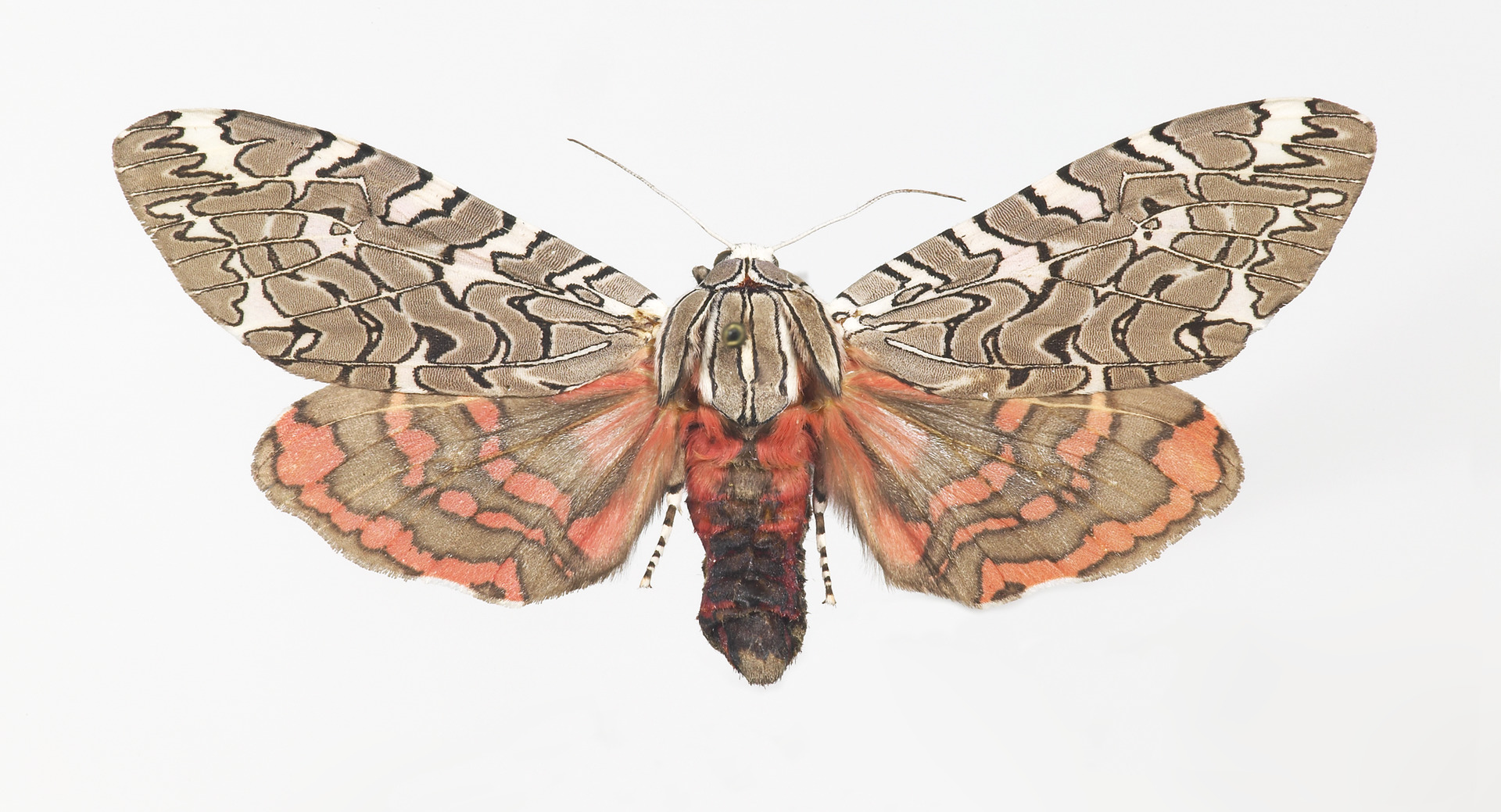

Scientific classification
- Domain: Eukaryota
- Kingdom: Animalia
- Phylum: Arthropoda
- Class: Insecta
- Order: Lepidoptera
- Superfamily: Noctuoidea
- Family: Erebidae
- Subfamily: Arctiinae
- Genus: Arachnis
- Species: A. picta

Binomial name
- Arachnis picta Packard, 1864

Synonyms
- Arachnis verna Barnes & McDunnough, 1918; Arachnis picta hampsoni Dyar, 1902

= Arachnis picta =

Species of moth

Arachnis picta, the painted tiger moth, is a moth of the family Erebidae. The species was first described by Alpheus Spring Packard in 1864. It is found in the Southwestern United States and the bordering parts of Mexico.

The wingspan is about 50 mm. The moth flies during the summer.

The larvae feed on herbaceous plants, such as Lupinus, radish and Acanthus species.

== Subspecies ==
- Arachnis picta picta
- Arachnis picta insularis Clarke, 1941 (California)
- Arachnis picta maia Ottolengui, 1896 (Colorado)
- Arachnis picta meadowsi Comstock, 1942
- Arachnis picta perotensis Schaus, 1889
- Arachnis picta verna Barnes & McDunnough, 1918
