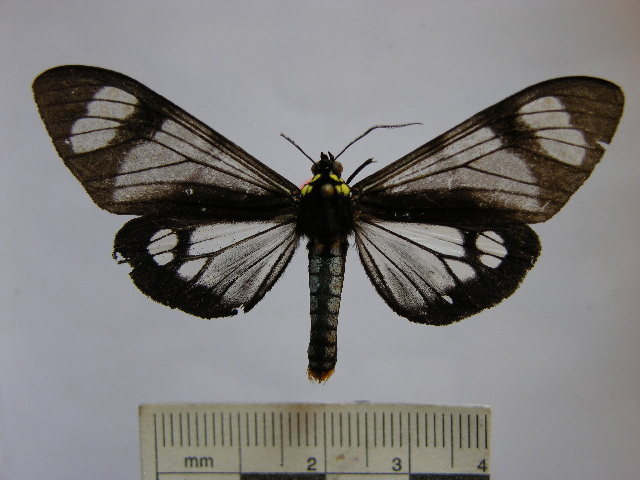

Scientific classification
- Domain: Eukaryota
- Kingdom: Animalia
- Phylum: Arthropoda
- Class: Insecta
- Order: Lepidoptera
- Superfamily: Noctuoidea
- Family: Erebidae
- Subfamily: Arctiinae
- Genus: Dysschema
- Species: D. tricolora

Binomial name
- Dysschema tricolora (Sulzer, 1776)

Synonyms
- Phalaena Noctua tricolora Sulzer, 1776; Phalaena aglaura Cramer, [1779]; Pericopis turbida Hübner, 1819; Pericopis lunifera Butler, 1871; Pericopis buckleyi Druce, 1910; Pericopis tricolor [sic] albisarta Prout, 1920; Pericopis evanescens Hering, 1925; Pericopis f. guaranitica Jörgensen, 1932; Pericopis f. obscurata Reich, 1934; Pericopis romani Bryk, 1953; Dysschema buckleyi (Druce, 1910); Dysschema evanescens (Hering, 1925); Dysschema lunifera Butler, 1871; Dysschema tricolor Auctt. (misspelling); Dysschema tricolor obscurata (Reich, 1934); Dysschema tricolor guaranitica (Jörgensen, 1932); Tetrisia tricolor (Sulzer, 1776)

= Dysschema tricolora =

Species of moth

Dysschema tricolora is a moth of the family Erebidae first described by Sulzer in 1776, and spelled tricolora, though many subsequent authors have misspelled the name as tricolor (e.g.). It is found in Suriname, Bolivia, Paraguay and Brazil.

== Subspecies ==
- Dysschema tricolora tricolora (Suriname, Bolivia, Paraguay)
- Dysschema tricolora romani (Bryk, 1953) (Brazil)
