= Carl Geyer =

German entomologist and scientific illustrator

Peter Carl Friedrich Geyer (1802–1889) was a German entomologist who wrote and illustrated various supplements to Jacob Hübner's works on Lepidoptera.

Carl Geyer was by profession an artist. He is not to be confused with Karl Andreas Geyer (1809–1853), a botanist and plant collector.
