= Curt Kosswig =

German zoologist & geneticist (1903–1982)

- Born: 30 October 1903; Berlin, German Empire
- Died: 29 March 1982 (aged 78); Hamburg, Federal Republic of Germany
- Burial place: Aşiyan Asri Cemetery, Istanbul, Turkey
- Occupation: University professor
- Years active: 1927–1969
- Partner: Leonore (m. 1930–1973)
- Children: Two sons

Academic background
- Education: Zoology, genetics
- Alma mater: Humboldt University of Berlin
- Thesis: "Das Gen in fremder Erbmasse", ("The Gene in Foreign Genotypes") (1927)
- Doctoral advisor: Erwin Bauer

Curt Kosswig (sometimes spelled "Koßwig") (30 October 1903, Berlin – 29 March 1982, Hamburg) was a German zoologist and geneticist, who spent most of his career at the University of Istanbul (1937–1955) and Hamburg University (1955–1969). Curt Kosswig is known as the Father of Turkish Zoology.

== Early life ==
Curt Kosswig was born in Berlin, German Empire. He attended Berlin's Schöneberg Hohenzollern School (Hohenzollernschule), graduating in 1922. Afterwards, he studied Zoology, and Genetics in the Faculty of Natural Sciences at the Humboldt University of Berlin, where he completed his PhD in 1927.

In 1930, he married Leonore (1904–1973), who was also a biologist. They would become acclaimed as a husband and wife research team in Turkey. They had two sons, the older of whom is named Kurt Kosswig (Kurt with a 'K' rather than his father's 'C') who became a chemist.

== Academic career ==
As a scholar, Kosswig published a wide range of subject matter, especially zoology. Among his publications were sex-determination systems, carcinogenesis, constructive and regressive evolution, genetics of house pets, zoological geography, and species classification.

=== Early rise in academia: pre-1927 ===
Completing his bachelor's degree at the University of Berlin, in the mid-1920s, he began to study for a PhD in genetics under Professor Erwin Bauer.

Kosswig published his first academic paper in 1925 in the German Journal for the Study of Animal Breeding and Hereditary Science (German: Zeitschrift für Tierzüchtung und Züchtungsbiologie). He was only 21 years old upon publication of his first paper. Another of his papers was accepted for publication in 1926.

Kosswig was awarded a doctorate (PhD) in genetics on 1 April 1927, at age 23. In this year, he published his doctoral research work as The Gene in Foreign Genotypes (German: Das Gen in fremder Erbmasse). He had conducted experiments with cyprinodonts, which were groundbreaking in the field of genetics, which "anticipated the concept now known as gene transfer in carcinogenesis."

Additionally, Kosswig published eleven more academic papers as a young PhD, from 1927 to 1929, for a total fourteen published papers by his 26th birthday.

=== Early career in Germany, 1927–33 ===
As Germany's situation deteriorated, and the Depression deepened, Kosswig's academic career soared, with seventeen more papers published between 1930 and 1933 for a prolific total of 31 papers published before his 30th birthday in late 1933. (In total, he authored or coauthored 152 papers that were published in journals between 1925 and 1948 alone, with many more later.)

In 1927, he got a job as an assistant professor at Münster University in Münster, Germany. Kosswig worker there for six years, starting the very semester that a Leopold von Ubisch (1886–1965) took over the Zoology Department. Kosswig would remain loyal to von Ubisch in the 1930s when Ubisch came under political persecution.

On 1 April 1933, he left Münster to be installed as a professor at Braunschweig University of Technology. He retained this position until fall 1937, when he abruptly left for Turkey. The story of his emigration to Turkey belongs more in the realm of politics.

=== Involvement in politics and Rassenkunde, 1933–36 ===
Kosswig was not a member of any political party before 1933. In November 1933, Kosswig joined the SS, an elite branch of the Nazi Party (NSDAP). His relations with the Nazi Party were never warm, though, as demonstrated by the events of 1935 in Münster. He supported the principles of academic freedom and supported all academic non-conformists who came under political persecution by the state.

While at Braunschweig from 1933 onward, Kosswig came under the purview of the newly created SS Race and Settlement Main Office (German: Rasse- und Siedlungshauptamt der SS, RuSHA) under Walther Darre. Kosswig was asked to serve as an educator for this organization. Part of his duties included lecturing NSDAP party members and groups of interested citizens about genetics and racial anthropology (called Rassenkunde).

Kosswig preferred the academic world to the political, and had never registered with any political party in his 20s. In November 1933, Kosswig joined the SS (see note for possible reasons), an elite branch of the NSDAP (Nazi Party). His relations with the Nazi Party were never warm, though, as demonstrated by the events of 1935 in Münster.

=== The Munster Zoology Department chairmanship crisis, 1934–36 ===
From 1933, the new German government instituted a policy of encouraging Jewish professors to leave German universities, especially those seen to be in positions of political importance. The head of the Munster Zoology Department, Professor von Ubisch, was half-Jewish and seen as politically unreliable. After a long controversy, Ubisch was finally dismissed from his post as head of the Zoology Department at Munster University in 1935, after which he emigrated to Norway. Kosswig, who had worked with Ubisch for six years at Munster, maintained his support for Ubisch.

Following the dismissal of his former superior, Kosswig was asked to take up the chair. He declined. As the authorities looked for possible candidates to replace Ubisch, the entire local academic community became involved, some supporting Ubisch and some opposing him. Ubisch's two assistants were fired. Kosswig (then an assistant professor at Braunschweig University) secured jobs for both of the dismissed assistants. This, on top of refusing to take the seat itself in protest, lost him favor in the eyes of the party. These are factors which may have contributed to his own decision to leave Germany in 1937.

=== Emigration to Turkey, 1937 ===
Following the "Ubisch succession crisis" in Münster, Kosswig left the SS in 1936.

He also started thinking about leaving Germany itself, which he did in autumn 1937 at the invitation of the University of Istanbul and some German professors, who were already there. In doing so, he became one of the 190 total German academics, who emigrated to Turkey during the 1930s in Germany.

Kosswig remained outside Germany during World War II (1939–1945) and the occupation and reconstruction of Germany (Wiederaufbau) periods, but retained active contact with his European colleagues, exchanging materials, information, and research.

=== Career in Turkey, 1937–55 ===
His output was prolific in his Turkish years, with hundreds of articles published, and an entire major university department being built around him at Istanbul. The Zoology Department at the University of Istanbul, which still exists today, is considered to have been entirely founded by Curt Kosswig.

Already in 1937, Kosswig was appointed director of the Istanbul Zoology Museum. He oversaw its expansion and "collected examples of mammals, birds, reptiles, frogs, fish and various invertebrates, which he brought in the museum contributing to its enrichment."

In these years, Kosswig expanded his field of study to include mammals, comparative genetics, gender inheritance, tumor genetics, gene manifestation, Anatolian fauna, and even continental drift theory. He worked with and encouraged his doctoral students to study, among other things, hereditary tumors in animals, fish polygenic sex determination, freshwater and marine fish in Anatolia, animal species systematics, giant chromosome structure, fish intersexuality, DDT effects, and symbiotic nitrogen fixation in bacteria.

Kosswig discovered, identified, and named many new species in this time, including the rare Saz Baligi which means "reed fish" (Garra kemali) and Gölçük toothcarp (Aphanius splendens). In 1942, a colleague Dr. Sözer named a new genus of scaleless killifish Kosswigichthys in his honor. In 1945, Kosswig and this same colleague described a similar genus as Anatolichthys in honor of their place of origin in Anatolia.

Kosswig continued publishing and research, and even took up the role of "adventurer" in search of new and lost species. In this context, in 1950, he became one of the first Europeans allowed by Turkey to cross the Euphrates into southeastern Turkey, on a voyage he organized and led "in pursuit of two ancient species—a saltwater fish in the hills above Lake Van and the fabled bald ibis of Birecik".

Kosswig is also remembered as the founder of the bird sanctuary at Lake Manyas, now called Lake Kuş (literally "Lake Bird") in northwestern Turkey, which still exists today In 1959, the area around the Lake Kuş was declared Kuşcenneti National Park ("Bird Paradise National Park"), and later a Ramsar site.

=== Back in Germany, 1955–69 ===
Kosswig returned to Germany in 1955 at the invitation of the University of Hamburg. He worked there for fourteen years until being bestowed the title of Professor Emeritus in 1969. He served as the director of the Zoological Institute and the Zoological Museum at Hamburg University.

== Death ==
Curt Kosswig died in Hamburg on 29 March 1982. His body was transferred to Istanbul upon his last will. On 8 April 1982, he was buried in the Aşiyan Asri Cemetery following a ceremony held in the Central Building of Istanbul University.

== Lifetime honors ==
- Honorary Doctorate awarded by the University of Istanbul, whose zoology department he founded.
- In 2003, in honor of the centenary of Curt Kosswig's birth, the faculties for Natural Sciences and Marine Sciences of the University of Istanbul and the Zoological Department and Museum of the University of Hamburg held a joint memorial symposium in honor of his life and work.

== Tributes ==
1942:The monospecific genus Kosswigichthys is named after him. (See above)

1947:The monospecific genus of beetles Kosswigia is named after him.

1955:The smooth newt Lissotriton kosswigi is named after him.

1960:The barb Carasobarbus kosswigi honors Kosswig, because he collected the type specimen of this species among others he collected in Turkey.

1963:The genus of planthopper bugs Kosswigianella is named after him.

1964:The stone loach Turcinoemacheilus kosswigi honors Kosswig, because he collected the type specimen of this species among others he collected in Turkey.

1965:The bristletail Japyx kosswigi is named after him.

1969:A scraper barb Capoeta kosswigi was proposed but later reduced to a synonym.

1971:A barbel Luciobarbus kosswigi was proposed but later reduced to a synonym.

1972:The chub Squalius kosswigi honors Kosswig, because he collected the type specimen of this species among others he collected in Turkey.

2017:The minnow Alburnoides kosswigi honors Kosswig for being the “Father of ichthyology in Turkey".

== Links ==
- A list of Curt Kosswig's publications (PDF; German and Turkish)
- A Curt Kosswig Web Site (Turkish)
