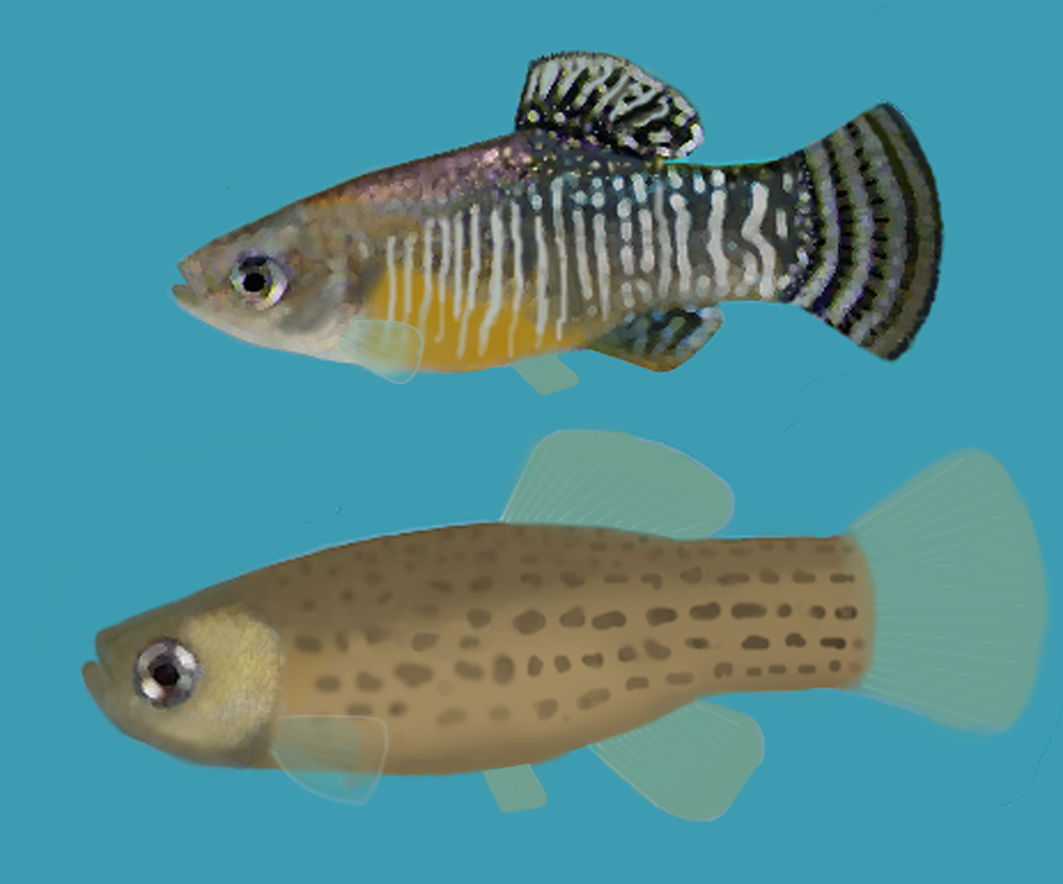
- Male toothcarp (top) and female toothcarp (bottom)

Conservation status
- Near Threatened (IUCN 3.1)

Scientific classification
- Kingdom: Animalia
- Phylum: Chordata
- Class: Actinopterygii
- Order: Cyprinodontiformes
- Family: Aphaniidae
- Genus: Apricaphanius
- Species: A. iberus

Binomial name
- Apricaphanius iberus (Valenciennes, 1846)
- Distribution of the Spanish toothcarp

Synonyms
- Aphanius iberius (Valenciennes, 1846); Aphanius iberus (Valenciennes, 1846); Cyprinodon ibericus (Steindachner, 1865); Cyprinodon iberus Valenciennes, 1846; Lebias ibera (Valenciennes, 1846); Lebias ibericus Steindachner, 1865; Lebias iberus (Valenciennes, 1846)

= Spanish toothcarp =

Species of fish

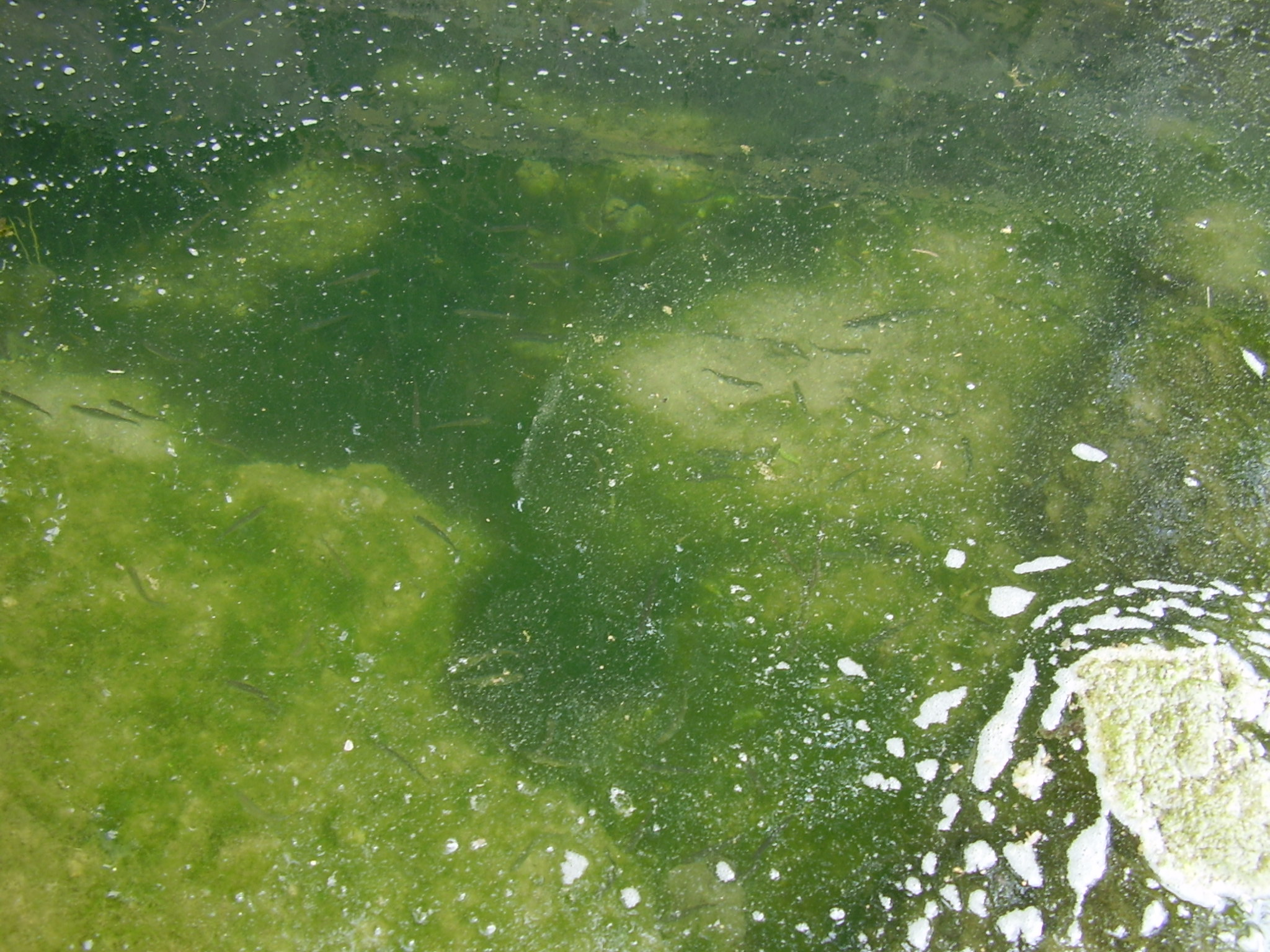
Fartets in their natural habitat

The Spanish toothcarp (Apricaphanius iberus), also known as the Spanish pupfish or Iberian killifish, is a small species of ray-finned fish in the family Aphaniidae endemic to Spain.

== Vernacular names ==
This fish is known as fartet in Spanish, and as fartet or peixet de sequiol in Catalan (including Valencian). The latter sometimes also uses the term fartonet, which is the diminutive of fartet.

== Taxonomy ==
The genus Apricaphanius contains three species. One of them, A. saourensis, is found in Algeria, and the other two are endemic to Spain. The other Spanish species is A. baeticus; it was not recognized as distinct from A. iberus until 2002.

== Description ==
The Spanish toothcarp is a small fish, rarely more than 5 cm (2.0 in) in length. Females are longer than males of the same age. It has an oblong body and rounded fins. The dorsal fin is underdeveloped with respect to the fish's girth. It has large scales, numbering 20 to 26 across the body at its widest point.

The Spanish toothcarp exhibits obvious sexual dichromatism. The males have bluish to silver-colored vertical stripes on the flanks, as well as dark bands on the caudal fin, while the females are generally greenish-brown with dark blotches distributed irregularly over their bodies; the fins of females are transparent and mostly unpatterned. Females in some populations have short, dark vertical stripes as opposed to blotches.

== Distribution ==
The Spanish toothcarp is characteristic of the Iberian Peninsula, and its range extends from the Aigüamolls of Alt Empordà to Lake Adra in Almería. In particular, it has been found in the alluvial plains of the Segura River, the Chicamo River in Abanilla, the wetlands surrounding the Mar Menor, the Valencian Community (more specifically in the Parc Natural el Fondo, and in the Parc Natural de l'Albufera with its springs), the Parque Natural del Delta del Ebro in Tarragona, the Adra River and the Albufera de Adra.

== Habitat ==
Spanish toothcarps inhabit shallow, slow-moving bodies of water such as river-mouths, coastal lakes, and ponds. They occur in saline and fresh water alike, due to their ability to tolerate high levels of salinity. The Spanish toothcarp can tolerate temperatures of 10–32 °C (50–90 °F), and pH levels between 6.5 and 7.5.

Despite their adaptability, they have been displaced by invasive species, such as the mosquitofish, introduced from North America to Spain in 1921 by doctor Sadí de Buen Lozano in an attempt to control malarial mosquitoes. The toothcarp has, in some places, retreated to high salinity areas, where the mosquitofish cannot live.

== Biology ==
Generally, Spanish toothcarps travel in small groups, staying near underwater vegetation, where they normally go unnoticed.

=== Reproduction ===
The lifespan of a Spanish toothcarp is short, reaching sexual maturity at merely 3 months of age. The females spawn repeatedly each season, producing from 100 to 900 eggs. Toothcarps in the Murcia region tend to spawn between April and August (hence, a female hatching in April can already reproduce in June of the same year), while more northerly populations, such as those in the Ebro River Delta, lay their eggs between May and August. During the mating season, the males become territorial and, when there is a female around, perform courtship displays consisting of "lateral exhibitions" and circular movements around the female, one after another. Spawning is done on an appropriate substrate, usually on the leaves of aquatic plants or on filamentous algae. The eggs, about 1 mm in diameter and transparent and very sticky, are deposited one by one or in small groups. Hatchlings emerge approximately 8 days after the eggs are laid.

=== Diet ===
The Spanish toothcarp is an omnivore, and eats insects, crustaceans, worms and algae.

=== Evolutionary strategy ===
As already mentioned above, the biology of the Spanish toothcarp is characterized by high growth rate, early maturity, high reproductive rate, multiple periods of egg-laying and short lifespan. From an evolutionary ecology point of view, this lifestyle is suitable for fish that live in unstable environments, such as estuaries, where unpredictable conditions increase mortality. In the case of the Spanish toothcarp, this lifestyle allows it to exploit environmentally favorable conditions during the short intervals in which they occur.

== Conservation status ==
The risk of extinction of the Spanish toothcarp is one of the greatest of any Iberian vertebrate. Its limited range, coupled with the drastic population decline the species has suffered in the 1970s, 1980s and 1990s, has caused it to be placed on endangered species lists, both in Spain and internationally. Its conservation status in the south of the Iberian Peninsula has notably worsened.

Among the threats are:

- Water contamination by agricultural and urban waste
- Habitat destruction, primarily from development
- Introduced species such as Louisiana crawfish, mosquitofish and largemouth bass
- Disappearance of channels and irrigation ponds
- Stream bed contamination by accidental spills
- Unintended consequences of combating eutrophication from algae, using toxic chemicals such as copper sulfate, or by covering them to prevent sunlight from reaching the water
- Eutrophication from algae
- Contamination of albuferas
- Fishkeeping once increased their decline, as they were highly valued by aquarists. This interest has recently shifted to more colorful tropical fish.

== See also ==
- Samaruc - A similar Iberian killifish, from Valencia
