= Ubisch =

von Ubisch is a German surname. Notable people with the surname include:

- Gerta von Ubisch (1882–1965), German geneticist
- Leopold von Ubisch (1886–1965), German zoologist
