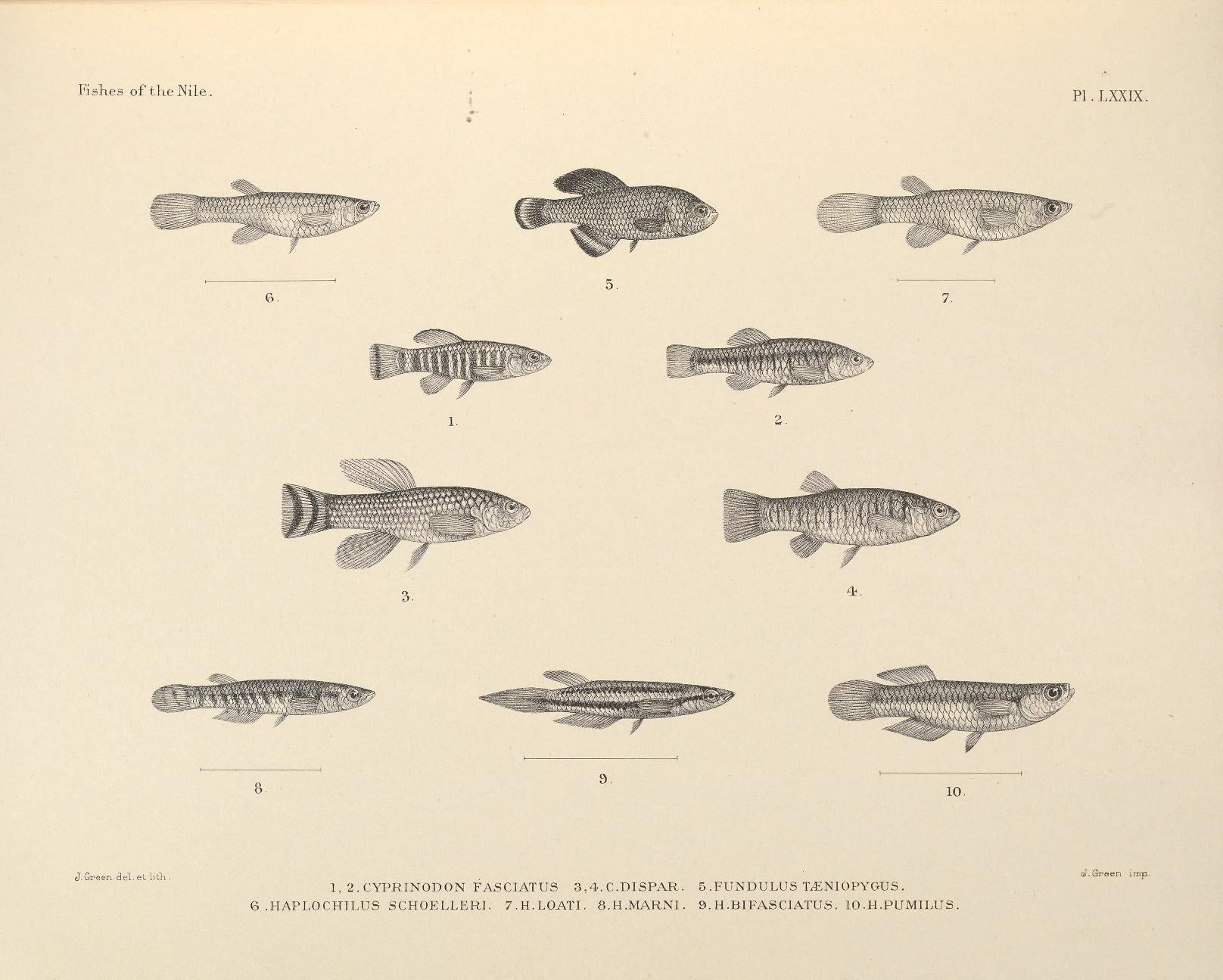
- The Fishes of the Nile, displaying several tooth carps. The fish marked 3 and 4 are a male and female Aphaniops dispar, respectively

Conservation status
- Least Concern (IUCN 3.1)

Scientific classification
- Kingdom: Animalia
- Phylum: Chordata
- Class: Actinopterygii
- Division: Teleostei
- Order: Cyprinodontiformes
- Family: Aphaniidae
- Genus: Aphaniops
- Species: A. dispar

Binomial name
- Aphaniops dispar Rüppell, 1829)

Synonyms
- Lebias dispar Rüppell, 1829; Aphanius dispar (Rüppell, 1829); Cyprinodon dispar (Rüppell, 1829); Lebias lunatus Ehrenberg, 1846; Lebias velifer Ehrenberg, 1846; Aphanius velifer (Ehrenberg, 1846); Cyprinodon lunatus Valenciennes, 1846; Aphanius lunatus (Valenciennes, 1846); Aphanius foemina (Valenciennes, 1846); Cyprinodon stoliczkanus Day, 1872; Aphanius stoliczkanus (Day, 1872); Cyprinodon richardsoni Boulenger, 1907; Aphanius richardsoni (Boulenger, 1907); Cyprinodon cilensis Gianferrari, 1930; Alphaniops cilensis (Gianferrari, 1930); Aphanius cilensis (Gianferrari, 1930); Aphanius airebejensis (Gianferrari, 1933); Cyprinodon zaccarinii Gianferrari, 1933; Aphaniops zaccarinii (Gianferrari, 1933); Aphanius zaccarinii (Gianferrari, 1933); Cyprinodon darrorensis Gianferrari, 1933; Aphaniops darrorensis (Gianferrari, 1933); Aphanius darrorensis (Gianferrari, 1933)

= Arabian toothcarp =

Species of fish

The Arabian toothcarp (Aphaniops dispar), known also as the mother-of-Pearl fish is a species of killifish belonging to the family Aphaniidae . It can be found from the shores of the Red Sea south to Ethiopia, the Gulf of Aden, the Arabian Sea and along the Persian Gulf east to Pakistan and India. It is also found in the Suez Canal, the northern coast of the Sinai Peninsula, and in one location on the Israeli coast. The former recognized subspecies: A. d. richardsoni, the Dead Sea toothcarp endemic to the Dead Sea has now been raised to a full species as Aphaniops richardsoni.

== Taxonomy ==
The Arabian toothcarp was reassigned from the genus Aphanius in 2020 in the course of a reclassification of several species in that genus.

== Description ==
A. dispar is a chubby and robust fish in both sexes with a similar body plan lacking any spines, but here is where their similarities end. This species expresses extreme sexual dimorphism in both appearance and behaviour. The larger males are very brightly coloured with long fins that may reach the end of the tail when lowered. He is a lustrous greyish blue with bright silver spots spread across his body, with a relatively sharp snout. The fins are light yellow with thick black bands running across his tail fin and spots on his dorsal and ventral fins. The smaller females are brownish-silver with distinctive brown marks running down her sides, with a smoother snout. Her fins are smaller and her tail is distinctly shaped like a square. This fish is coated with a pearly lustre, giving rise to one of their names, the "Mother-of-Pearl fish" The males are solitary and less commonly encountered, while females and younger males are gregarious, forming small shoals. The size is about 8 cm (3 in) for males and 6 cm (2 in) for females.

== Habitat ==
The Arabian pupfish inhabits a wide variety of water bodies, though it prefers hard alkaline. It is an extremely euryhaline fish, capable of tolerating salinities from below 1 ppt (pure freshwater) to hypersaline conditions of almost 140 ppt. For reference, seawater has an average salinity of 35 ppt. Throughout its range, the Arabian pupfish can be seen in several aquatic habitats. It is commonly encountered in coastal zones and estuaries, with the greatest number observed being in mangrove forests where they hide amongst the roots and leaves of the plants in groups of hundreds. They can also be found in freshwater environments such as oases and lakes through Saudi Arabia, the UAE, and Oman

== Diet ==
This fish is an omnivore, feeding on any organic debris such as algae, freshwater crustaceans and small insects. In freshwater habitats, their main source of food is the larvae of mosquitoes, whilst smaller aquatic worms are often targeted by groups of fish. Its prolific feeding on mosquito larvae had led to it being used as a method of pest control in several countries.

== Conservation and threats ==
The Arabian pupfish is listed as a species of least concern by the IUCN with a stable population in 2013. Owing to the outdated status, this fish has faced several threats in recent days especially with freshwater populations. These fish are threatened by water pollution, lack of food, and habitat degradation which led to noticeable declines in population densities throughout their range. The introduction of the mosquitofish, a widespread invasive species has proven detrimental to the fish, as it outcompetes A. dispar. The status of this fish is only believed to worsen with time as there is a dire lack of conservation efforts.
