= Esmaeilius vladykovi =

Scientific classification
- Kingdom: Animalia
- Phylum: Chordata
- Class: Actinopterygii
- Division: Teleostei
- Order: Cyprinodontiformes
- Family: Aphaniidae
- Genus: Esmaeilius
- Species: E. vladykovi

Binomial name
- Esmaeilius vladykovi Coad, 1988

Synonyms
- Aphanius vladykovi

Species of fish

Esmaeilius vladykovi (Zagros toothcarp) is a species of killifish in the family Aphaniidae endemic to a restricted area of the central Zagros Mountains of Iran. It can also be found in the aquarium trade. Its specific name honours the zoologist Vadim D. Vladykov (1898-1986) who studied the fishes of the Caspian basin and the person who accepted the species author, Brian W. Coad, as a graduate student.

Its name in Persian is ماهی پرچمی (mahi-e parchami) [flagfish] or ماهی گورخری زاگرس (mahi-e gour-e khari-e Zagros) which means Zagros zebrafish or ماهی کپور دندان دار زاگرس (Mahi-e kapoor-e dandan dare zagros) [Zagros tooth carp]. Little information on this species beyond the original description and some brief biological observations is available.

The main habitats of the fish are Choghakhor Lagoon, Gandoman Lagoon, Salm Lake, Shalamzar Lake and Beheshtabad River all in Chaharmahal va Bakhtiari Province, Iran. The native fish population is threatened by different factors including environmental pollution as well as biological threats such as parasites. The fish has been infected with migratory parasite larvae to the extent of 100 and 68 percent, respectively in 2011 and 2018.

This species is a close relative of Esmaeilius sophiae, but characterised by a higher lateral line scale counts and by its color pattern: males have darker coloration on the dorsal fin and a lighter one on the anal fin. Females lack the typical, large, lozenge-shaped spot at the base of the caudal fin seen in A. sophiae.

The stomach content of this fish consists mostly of freshwater crustaceans and the relative length of the gut suggests a carnivorous habit. The eggs have an average diameter of 1 mm and the average absolute and relative fecundity is 415 and 110, respectively. The gonadosomatic ratio and ovary condition suggests that the reproductive season of the species is between late March and June with a peak in early April. The species is euryhaline and eurythermal and prefers neutral to basic waters. It is usually found in well-oxygenated waters, but is tolerant to hypoxia, as well.
