= Farsi toothcarp =

Conservation status
- Extinct in the Wild (IUCN 3.1)

Scientific classification
- Kingdom: Animalia
- Phylum: Chordata
- Class: Actinopterygii
- Division: Teleostei
- Order: Cyprinodontiformes
- Family: Aphaniidae
- Genus: Esmaeilius
- Species: E. persicus

Binomial name
- Esmaeilius persicus (J. T. Jenkins, 1910)

Synonyms
- Aphanius farsicus Teimori, Esmaeili & Reichenbacher, 2011; Aphanius persicus (J. T. Jenkins, 1910); Cyprinodon persicus J. T. Jenkins, 1910; Lebias persicus (J. T. Jenkins, 1910)

Species of fish

Esmaeilius persicus, commonly known as the Farsi toothcarp or Maharlo Killifish is a species of pupfish belonging to the family Aphaniidae. It was endemic to the Maharloo Lake Basin in Iran and is now listed as extinct in the wild by the IUCN as the last known wild population died in 2015. It resided primarily in springs, lagoons, and marshes that contain fresh to brackish water.

== Taxonomy ==
The species name, persicus, refers to Persia, the ancient name of Iran, where the fish is found. It was originally described as Cyprinodon persicus, and was later placed in the genus Aphanius. Then, in late 2011, a Late Miocene fossil genus Brachylebias was synonymised with Aphanius, which suggested a change to the extant species as there was a B. persicus which preoccupied the name. One replacement name proposed was farsicus, referring to Iran's Fars province, but this was not universally accepted. Finally, in 2020, the species was added to a newly erected genus Esmaeilius as Esmaeilius persicus.

== Description ==
Farsi toothcarp reach approximately 4.9 cm (1.9 in) in total length. Like all members of its genus, the fish shows sexual dimorphism. Females have numerous alternating light and dark bars, which gradually merge with the pigmentation on the rest of their bodies. The caudal fin spot has been described as elongate, oval, or teardrop-shaped, but is almost always shaped in the form of a lozenge.

Males, on the other hand, are similar in coloring to Esmaeilius sophiae, bearing light flank bars narrower than the alternating dark bars of females. The dorsal, anal, and caudal fins all have clear margins, whereas the rest of the fins are dark in color.

== Conservation status ==
The species is currently listed as extinct in the wild by the International Union for Conservation of Nature. It was once locally abundant in streams and springs within the Maharlo Lake basin but was in decline due to the springs which it inhabited desiccating or being altered by human activity. The last known wild population died in 2015 after its habitat was lost and no further wild individuals have been recorded elsewhere since then.

Captive populations exist in Iran, in Europe and in various other aquariums, mostly those owned by hobbyists. Although attempts are being made to reestablish wild populations of the species, there was no information on the success of the reintroductions during the IUCN assessment in 2023 which was published in 2026.
