= Kızılırmak toothcarp =

Kızılırmak toothcarp can refer to:

- Anatolichthys danfordii
- Anatolichthys marassantensis
