= Anatolichthys transgrediens =

Conservation status
- Critically Endangered (IUCN 3.1)

Scientific classification
- Kingdom: Animalia
- Phylum: Chordata
- Class: Actinopterygii
- Order: Cyprinodontiformes
- Family: Aphaniidae
- Genus: Anatolichthys
- Species: A. transgrediens

Binomial name
- Anatolichthys transgrediens (Ermin, 1946)

Synonyms
- Turkichthys transgrediens Ermin, 1946

Species of fish

Anatolichthys transgrediens, the Acı Göl toothcarp or Acipinar killifish, is a species of freshwater fish in the family Aphaniidae. It is endemic to the springs of Lake Acıgöl in Turkey. It is threatened by a reduction in rainfall from climate change, and the abstraction of water from the springs. The introduction of the non-native eastern mosquitofish also threatens this species.

== Ecology & habitat ==
Aphanius transgrediens is endemic to Lake Acigöl, Turkey, a lake sourced from sulfurous springs (on the south-eastern margins of the lake itself), and containing sodium sulphate and other salts whose harvest is a significant economic activity in the region. Due to severe fluctuations in water levels and chemical composition, this species is mostly restricted to the margins of the lake in spring fields of varying salinity. These ponds are typically very shallow and occupied by growths of filamentous algae of the genus Chara. Winter rainfall allows migration between sites through rivulets around the periphery of the lake, causing a greater genetic diversity within populations, which extend across 1 km^{2} (0.39 sq mi). This minor migration occurs in late summer, and in the opposite direction in early summer. It is most likely omnivorous, feeding upon aquatic invertebrates and plants. Females are batch-spawners, producing 5-11 eggs per batch on vegetation in a site defended by males. Eggs are 1.3-1.5 mm in diameter, and are laid from early spring to late autumn.

== Threats ==
Aphanius transgrediens occupies an extremely restricted area of 30 springs that is almost entirely in danger of destruction by the construction of a new road. Previously, the species inhabited the lake itself and its catchment and within the spring fields. In addition, A. transgrediens is threatened by invasive species, degradation of habitat (also by livestock trampling), and climate change. It is therefore assessed as critically endangered by the IUCN on criteria B1ab (i, ii, iii, iv, v) + 2ab (i, ii, iii, iv, v). Remaining conservation measures are mostly restricted to ex-situ work.
