= Anatolichthys splendens =

Conservation status
- Extinct (IUCN 3.1)

Scientific classification
- Kingdom: Animalia
- Phylum: Chordata
- Class: Actinopterygii
- Order: Cyprinodontiformes
- Family: Aphaniidae
- Genus: Anatolichthys
- Species: †A. splendens

Binomial name
- †Anatolichthys splendens (Kosswig & Sözer, 1945)

Synonyms
- Aphanius splendens Kosswig & Sözer, 1945

Extinct species of fish

Anatolichthys splendens, the Gölçük toothcarp or splendid toothcarp, is an extinct species of freshwater fish in the family Aphaniidae. It was endemic to Lake Gölçük in Turkey. It became extinct due to the effects of fish introduced to the lake.
