= Aphaniops stiassnyae =

Conservation status
- Endangered (IUCN 3.1)

Scientific classification
- Kingdom: Animalia
- Phylum: Chordata
- Class: Actinopterygii
- Order: Cyprinodontiformes
- Family: Aphaniidae
- Genus: Aphaniops
- Species: A. stiassnyae

Binomial name
- Aphaniops stiassnyae (Getahun & Lazara, 2001)

Synonyms
- Lebias stiassnyae Getahun & Lazara, 2001; Aphanius stiassnyae (Getahun & Lazara, 2001)

Species of fish

The Lake Afdera killifish (Aphaniops stiassnyae) is a species of fish in the family Aphaniidae. It is found in Lake Afdera in Ethiopia. The species was evaluated by the IUCN on 1 May 2009 and listed as endangered on the Red List.

== Etymology ==
The species name, stiassnyae, is named after Melanie L.J. Stiassny, who studied African fish.

== Description ==
The Lake Afdera killifish reaches a maximum length of 7.7 cm (3.0 in). It has a sharply upturned lower jaw; it is also one of two species in its genus to possess conical teeth.
