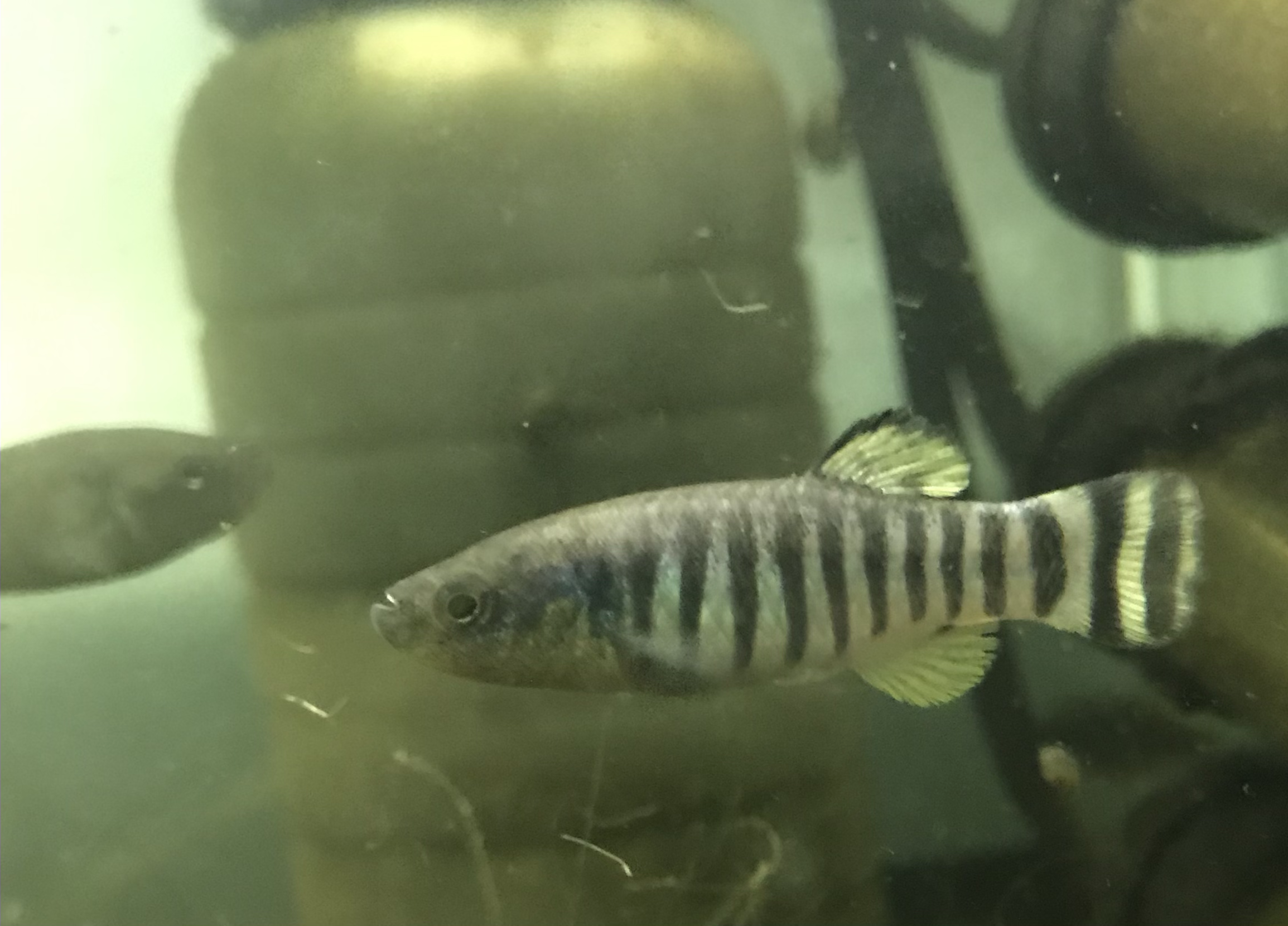
- Male Aphaniops sirhani in aquarium.

Conservation status
- Critically Endangered (IUCN 3.1)

Scientific classification
- Kingdom: Animalia
- Phylum: Chordata
- Class: Actinopterygii
- Order: Cyprinodontiformes
- Family: Aphaniidae
- Genus: Aphaniops
- Species: A. sirhani

Binomial name
- Aphaniops sirhani Villwock, Scholl & Krupp, 1983

= Aphaniops sirhani =

Species of fish

Aphaniops sirhani, the Azraq toothcarp, is a species of fish in the family Aphaniidae. It is endemic to the Azraq Wetland Reserve in Jordan. This species occurs in shallow water where there is vegetation and stones, or over muddy substrates where it feeds on insect larvae and crustaceans. They breed in the Spring.

In 1983, Aphaniops sirhani was described for the first time as a new species of killifish. It was found at Azraq Wetland Reserve in Jordan, the only habitat for this species in the world. Habitat changes and the introduction of other fish species reduced its population until it almost disappeared in 1989 and was thought to be extinct in the mid-1990s. In 2000 a survey showed that there were around 45 adult fish remaining within the Azraq wetland. In 2001 a rescue mission involving captive breeding was initiated to secure the species' future, aiming at reintroducing captive fish into the wild. While the population is stable as of 2014, it is entirely dependent on the wetland, whose water levels are currently artificially maintained to counter illegal extraction of water. Successful reintroduction to the wild will depend on factors including the removal of the alien mango tilapia and the attainment of a naturally stable and sufficient body of water.
