= Kızılırmak =

Kızılırmak may refer to:

- Kızılırmak, Çankırı, a town and district in Central Anatolia, Turkey
- Kızılırmak River, Turkey
  - Kızılırmak Delta
  - Kızılırmak toothcarp, a species of fish
- Erkut Kızılırmak (born 1969), Turkish motor racing driver
- Kızılırmak (group), a Turkish folk music group
