= Anatolichthys anatoliae =

Conservation status
- Near Threatened (IUCN 3.1)

Scientific classification
- Kingdom: Animalia
- Phylum: Chordata
- Class: Actinopterygii
- Division: Teleostei
- Order: Cyprinodontiformes
- Family: Aphaniidae
- Genus: Anatolichthys
- Species: A. anatoliae

Binomial name
- Anatolichthys anatoliae (Leidenfrost, 1912)

Synonyms
- Aphanius anatoliae (Leidenfrost, 1912); Aphanius chantrei subsp. aksaranus Akşiray, 1948; Aphanius chantrei subsp. flavianalis Akşiray, 1948; Aphanius chantrei subsp. obrukensis Akşiray, 1948; Aphanius chantrei subsp. venustus Kosswig & Sözer, 1945; Cyprinodon anatoliae Leidenfrost, 1912; Cyprinodon lykaoniensis Leidenfrost, 1912; Lebias anatoliae (Leidenfrost, 1912)

Species of fish

Anatolichthys anatoliae, commonly known as the Anatolian giant killifish or Laz Tuz killifish, is a species of fish in the family Aphaniidae that is endemic to Central Anatolia, Turkey. It occupies clear, well-oxygenated running freshwaters and pools around Lake Tuz, the Lake Beyşehir basin, and regions extending from Konya eastward to Niğde.

The species faces significant conservation pressures, and the International Union for Conservation of Nature (IUCN) lists it as Near Threatened, primarily due to habitat degradation from groundwater extraction, agricultural water use, and the desiccation of natural springs. Additional threats include competition and predation from introduced mosquito fish of the genus Gambusia.

As one of the several endemic killifish in Anatolia, A. anatoliae has become a focus of regional conservation planning, with ongoing research aimed at clarifying its population structure, distribution, and habitat requirements.

== Description ==
A. anatoliae have a slightly indented forehead and a gently curved back that becomes more rounded behind the head. Their underside is mostly straight or slightly curved, and the tail base is narrow and flat. The body is flattened from side to side and is tallest around where the dorsal fin begins, with the widest part near the pectoral fins. The lower jaw sticks out and points upward. Males and females have slightly different body proportions, especially in the tail base. The pectoral fins are rounded and extend most of the way toward the pelvic fins. The pelvic fins start slightly ahead of the dorsal fin and may or may not reach the anus. Females have a slightly swollen area near the reproductive opening when they are ready to breed. The anal fin has a curved edge, and the dorsal fin is rounded in females but longer and more extended in males. Both sexes have a caudal fin that is rounded.

=== Male morphology ===
Male A. anatoliae typically display a light silver-grey body tone. Along their sides, stretching from the back down to the belly, they usually exhibit between six and ten dark grey vertical stripes. These vertical stripes can differ in thickness and number depending on the population. During breeding season, males will develop a striking black dorsal fin, accented with a pale grey band near its base. Their anal fin turns a lemon yellow, often outlined with a thin black edge, and it may show faint strips or spots towards the back. However, in some groups, the black edge will appear thicker and appear towards the end of the anal fin. The caudal fin ranges from nearly transparent to pale yellow or white, generally marked with two or three cross-bars. The male A. anatoliae morphology can be seen above in Figure 1.

=== Female morphology ===
Female A. anatoliae, on the other hand, are a pale silver-grey and have a dark grey spotting along their sides, with most of the marking centered around the mid-lateral line. The females have a distinct black spot that can usually be seen in the middle of the caudal peduncle. All of their fins are translucent. The female A. anatoliae morphology can be seen in Figure 2 above.

== Geographical distribution ==
Many populations of A. anatoliae living around Lake Tuz and southwestern Anatolia are now either endangered or extinct. This is mainly due to pollution and the loss of water caused by excessive agricultural use. Surveys in the 1990s found no fish in several lakes, including Ak, Yarışlı, Gölhisar, and Söğüt, suggesting that the species has disappeared from those areas entirely. Lake Söğüt and its nearby wetlands were reportedly drained in 1959 for farming, though the lake still appears on some modern maps. In 1996, researchers did find a small surviving population in irrigation canals near the village of Kırkpınar. In the Konya Plains, water canals have connected previously separate habitats, leading to A. anatoliae and another species, Anatolichthys mento, living in the same area. However, the long-term effects of their cohabitation are yet to be known.

== Ecology ==
A. anatoliae live in freshwater springs and small rivers that flow into lakes such as Tuz, Eğirdir, and Beyşehir. Figure 3 below provides a visual representation of their distribution. It also inhabits rivers, swamps, and pools around the Konya region, extending east to Niğde. Additionally, A. anatoliae can be found in the spring areas and lower parts of the Menderes River near Selçuk. This species usually stays near the shoreline in freshwater or slightly salty (brackish) environments.

== Diet ==
In Lake Eğirdir, A. anatoliae typically live in areas near the surface (dorsa zone) and feed on both bottom-dwelling (benthic) and open-water (pelagic) sources. Their main diet includes Gammarus pulex (a type of freshwater shrimp, diatoms (from the Bacillariophyta group), and aquatic insects.

== Life history ==
Although the genus Aphanius has been well-studied overall, there is limited research on the length and lifespan of individual species. Reported maximum lengths for A. anatoliae vary slightly across different populations. According to FishBase, the maximum total length is 5.0 cm, whereas a study by Schulz-Mirbach et al. (2006) documents individuals up to 5.8 cm in Lake Salda. In more recent studies, the largest specimens from Karaevi Lake reached 5.3 cm, which aligns with data from the population in Lake Eğirdir. Age analysis indicates individuals typically live up to four years, similar to findings from Eğirdir populations.

== Reproduction ==
Because A. anatoliae remains poorly described in scientific literature, its reproductive biology and behavior are not well understood. To provide context, researchers often refer to better-studied relatives within the family Aphaniidae. One such species is Anatolichthys meridonalis, whose reproductive cycle is well documented. This species shows peak spawning in July and September, producing eggs approximately 2.2 mm in diameter. It also matures early, has a short life cycle, and reproduces through repeated spawning events, laying eggs with high yolk content. These traits may offer insight into possible reproductive strategies of A. anatoliae, although species-specific studies are still needed.

== Conservation status ==
According to IUCN, the A. anatoliae population is decreasing, and their status is “Near Threatened”. The primary threats to A. anatoliae include water abstraction and the drying of small streams and springs. Many of the springs where the species were once found during the 20th century have already dried up, leading to the loss of several local populations. The increasing water demand, driven by a growing human population, along with reduced rainfall caused by climate change, is expected to further reduce available freshwater habitats.

=== Climate change ===
The Central Anatolian Ecoregion (CAE) is a 1,000-meter-high plateau made up of three main water basins: Konya Closed, Burdur, and Akarçay, as well as Lake Eğirdir, which once connected to the Mediterranean Sea through underground water systems. These basins have seen significant changes in recent years. Similar to other dry and semi-dry regions around the world, the CAE is expected to face rising temperatures and less rainfall due to climate change. Human activities such as habitat destruction, overuse of water, and pollution are likely to make these problems worse. Currently, many native freshwater fish species in the region are at serious risk. Two species have already gone extinct, with 65% of the fish species listed as threatened or nearly threatened. Climate change, along with dam construction, invasive species, and water withdrawal for farming, is putting even more pressure on these fish populations.

=== Threats ===
In addition to habitat loss and water scarcity, A. anatoliae faces significant threats from introduced fish species. One such predator is the pikeperch (Sander lucioperca), which was introduced to Lake Eğirdir in 1955 to improve fisheries by utilizing small forage fish. The species quickly adapted, became the dominant predator in the lake, and posed a major threat to native fish. Studies analyzing pikeperch diets have shown A. anatoliae makes up a substantial portion (24.4%) of its stomach content, indicating high predation pressure. Also, competition from invasive Gambusia species presents an additional threat. While their current spread is limited to the southern parts of A. anatoliae’s range due to colder winters in Central Anatolia, rising temperatures driven by climate change are expected to enable Gambusia to expand northward. This potential range overlap could further endanger A. anatoliae populations in the coming decades.

== Cultural significance ==
A. anatoliae does not hold any distinctive role in Turkish folklore, mythology, or traditional food culture. Unlike several other fish that feature symbolic value in broader Turkish traditions, such as the cultural importance of Black Sea anchovy representing fertility, abundance, and rebirth. The A. anatoliae has not been associated with those cultural narratives or regional customs. While it is possible to keep them in an aquarium, it is not commonly sold in the aquarium trade, mostly due to their conservation status (Near Threatened) and environmental needs, requiring clear, well-oxygenated running water that is around 10 to 25 degrees Celsius.
