= Esmaeilius shirini =

Scientific classification
- Domain: Eukaryota
- Kingdom: Animalia
- Phylum: Chordata
- Class: Actinopterygii
- Order: Cyprinodontiformes
- Family: Aphaniidae
- Genus: Esmaeilius
- Species: E. shirini

Binomial name
- Esmaeilius shirini Gholami, Esmaeili, Erpenbeck & Reichenbacher, 2014

Species of fish

Esmaeilius shirini, the Shirin toothcarp, or Khosroshirin tooth-carp, is a species of pupfish belonging to the family Aphaniidae. It is found in the Khosroshirin stream of the Kor River basin, Fars province, Iran. The species is threatened by the introduction of the predatory rainbow trout to their habitat. It is harmless to humans.
