= Anatolichthys villwocki =

Conservation status
- Least Concern (IUCN 3.1)

Scientific classification
- Kingdom: Animalia
- Phylum: Chordata
- Class: Actinopterygii
- Order: Cyprinodontiformes
- Family: Aphaniidae
- Genus: Anatolichthys
- Species: A. villwocki

Binomial name
- Anatolichthys villwocki Hrbek & Wildekamp, 2003

Species of fish

The Sakarya toothcarp (Anatolichthys villwocki) is a species of freshwater fish in the family Aphaniidae. It is endemic to the upper Sakarya River basin in Turkey. It is threatened by water abstraction, damming and a reduction of rainfall due to climate change. The specific name honours the German zoologist Wolfgang Villwock (1930-2014) of the University of Hamburg.
