= Kol toothcarp =

Scientific classification
- Domain: Eukaryota
- Kingdom: Animalia
- Phylum: Chordata
- Class: Actinopterygii
- Order: Cyprinodontiformes
- Family: Aphaniidae
- Genus: Esmaeilius
- Species: E. darabensis

Binomial name
- Esmaeilius darabensis Esmaeili, Teimori, Gholami & Reichenbacher 2014

Species of fish

Esmaeilius darabensis, the Kol toothcarp, is a species of killifish belonging to the family Aphaniidae. It can be found in the Golabi spring near the city of Darab in the Fars province, Iran. The species is threatened by droughts and the introduction of invasive species.

== Etymology ==
The scientific name, darabensis, comes from Darab, a city in Iran, as the species is found in a spring near to this location.

== Description ==
The Kol toothcarp, like all members of the genus Esmaeilius, display sexual dimorphism. Males have 9-18 flank bars, whereas females bear small vertical brown patches on their flanks.
