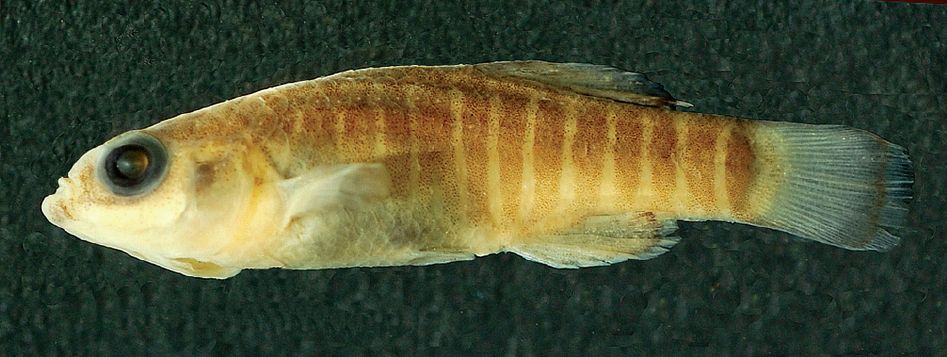
- Male
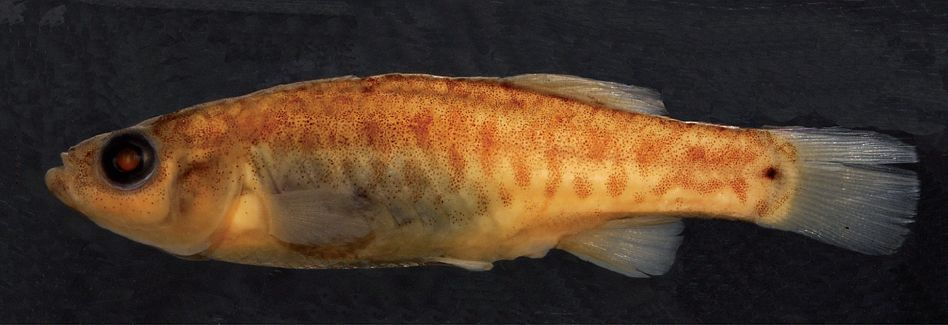
- Female

Scientific classification
- Kingdom: Animalia
- Phylum: Chordata
- Class: Actinopterygii
- Order: Cyprinodontiformes
- Family: Aphaniidae
- Genus: Esmaeilius
- Species: E. mesopotamicus

Binomial name
- Esmaeilius mesopotamicus Coad, 2009

Synonyms
- Aphanius mesopotamicus

= Esmaeilius mesopotamicus =

Species of fish

Esmaeilius mesopotamicus is a species of fish in the family Aphaniidae. It is found in the Euphrates basin of Iraq and Iran.
