= Arak toothcarp =

Scientific classification
- Domain: Eukaryota
- Kingdom: Animalia
- Phylum: Chordata
- Class: Actinopterygii
- Order: Cyprinodontiformes
- Family: Aphaniidae
- Genus: Esmaeilius
- Species: E. arakensis

Binomial name
- Esmaeilius arakensis (Teimori, Esmaeili, Gholami, Zarei & Reichenbacher (de), 2012)

Synonyms
- Aphanius arakensis

Species of fish

The Arak toothcarp (Esmaeilius arakensis) is a species of pupfish belonging to the family Cyprinodontidae. Discovered in 2012, it is endemic to the Namak Lake basin in Iran.

== Description ==
Male fish reach approximately 32 mm (1.3 in) in length, whereas the generally larger females reach approximately 34 mm (1.3 in). Males possess grey beards and dark bodies; their anal, dorsal, and caudal fins have white margins. Their pelvic and pectoral fins are yellowish. Females have a greyish pigmentation on their backs, and they have lighter heads and bellies. All their fins are white.

== Etymology ==
The species gets its name from where it is found— the city of Arak, the capital of the Markazi province in Iran.
