= Kosswigianella analis =

Scientific classification
- Domain: Eukaryota
- Kingdom: Animalia
- Phylum: Arthropoda
- Class: Insecta
- Order: Hemiptera
- Suborder: Auchenorrhyncha
- Infraorder: Fulgoromorpha
- Family: Delphacidae
- Genus: Kosswigianella
- Species: K. analis

Binomial name
- Kosswigianella analis (Crawford, 1914)

Species of true bug

Kosswigianella analis is a species of delphacid planthopper in the family Delphacidae. It is found in North America.
