= Istanbul Zoology Museum =

Museum in Istanbul, Turkey

- İstanbul Üniversitesi Zooloji Müzesi
- Location of Istanbul Zoology Museum
- Established: 1933; 93 years ago
- Location: Vezneciler Campus, Istanbul University, Fatih, Istanbul
- Coordinates: 41.013333°N 28.963611°E
- Type: Natural history
- Collection size: Insecta, Pisces, Amphibia, Reptilia, Aves, Mammalia and Invertebrate species
- Visitors: ca. 3,000 annually
- Owners: Istanbul University Faculty of Science, Department of Biology

Istanbul Zoology Museum, more precisely Zoology Museum of Istanbul University (Turkish: İstanbul Üniversitesi Zooloji Müzesi) is a natural history museum, located in Istanbul University's Vezneciler Campus at Fatih, Istanbul featuring animal collections. It was founded in 1933 and rearranged in 1989. The museum is owned and maintained by the Department of Biology at the Faculty of Science.

== History ==
The museum was established by the Swiss scientist, Prof. Dr. André Naville, who was appointed head of the Biology Department at Istanbul University right after the reformation of the universities in 1933. Zoological objects donated from Germany were placed in a small hall situated in the Zoology Department of the university.

After the sudden death of Naville in 1937, German hydrologist and zoologist Curt Kosswig took over the department. During his 15-year-long scientific research on the fauna of Anatolia, he collected examples of mammals, birds, reptiles, frogs, fish and various invertebrates, which he brought in the museum contributing to its enrichment.

In 1957, the top floors of the building were demolished, in which the museum was also situated. The collections of the museum were moved to a site in the Kuyucu Murad Pasha Madrasa, where they were stored for many years. In 1973, with the completion of a new building, the museum items were relocated to the new site.

The museum's artifacts were cleaned and restored after a long period of neglect by Dinçer Gülen and his team between 1987 and 1989. The museum was successfully reopened in 1989, presenting the collections in their current form.

== Exhibits ==
The museum, covering an area of 120 m^{2} (1,300 sq ft), consists of two sections for exhibitions and collections. The exhibition section is open to the public, while the collections section is for scientific use only.

In the collections section, around 1,500 Insecta, 35 Pisces, 45 Amphibia, 32 Reptilia, 143 Aves (most of them coming from Yıldız Palace), 170 Mammalia and 193 Invertebrate species are on display. Among them are rare items of Hatteria punctatus (Sphenodon punctatus), a reptile endemic to New Zealand, and extinct Panthera pardus tulliana (Anatolian leopard) the most important exhibits.

In the museum, there are also specimens of exotic fauna from other continents such as Alaskan moose (Alces alces), brown bear (Ursus arctos), spiny ant eater (Echidna), kangaroo, hippopotamus, crocodile and skeleton of tapir as well as elephant skulls.

In addition, pictures, furs and skeletons of various mammals, birds, arthropods and other species of Turkey are displayed in the museum.

Further examples and curiosities hosted in the museum are such as a lion given to President Celal Bayar (in office 1950-1960) during his official visit to Pakistan, a 9.5 kg (21 lb) weighing vulture with a wingspan of 2.70 m (8 ft 10 in), which was shot at Edirnekapı, Istanbul in 1945 and a six-legged lamb.

== Admission ==
Visiting of the museum is by appointment only. It is open on Mondays and Wednesdays. The visitors, around 3,000 annually, are mostly pupils and students.

== Bibliography ==
- İshakoğlu-Kadıoğlu, Sevtap (1998). İstanbul Üniversitesi Fen Fakültesi tarihçesi: (1900-1946) (in Turkish). İstanbul Üniversitesi Yayınları. p. 342. ISBN 9789754045017.
