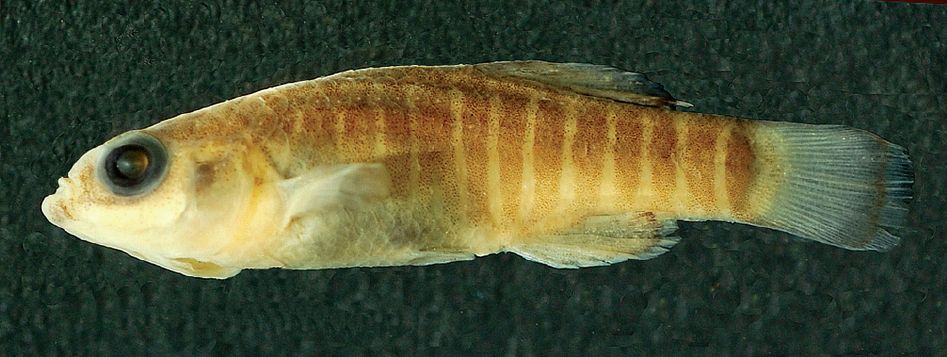
- Esmaeilius mesopotamicus, preserved

Scientific classification
- Domain: Eukaryota
- Kingdom: Animalia
- Phylum: Chordata
- Class: Actinopterygii
- Order: Cyprinodontiformes
- Family: Aphaniidae
- Genus: Esmaeilius; Freyhof & Yoğurtçuoğlu, 2020

Type species
- Lebias sophiae Heckel, 1847

= Esmaeilius =

Genus of fishes

Esmaeilius is a genus of toothcarps in the family Aphaniidae. Most are native to Iran, with the range of one species extending to Iraq as well. Most species in the genus have very small distributions and all are seriously threatened.

== Etymology ==
The generic name pertains to Hamid Reza Esmaeili, for his contribution to the understanding of diversity within the family Aphaniidae.

=== Species ===
There are ten valid species:

- Esmaeilius arakensis (Teimori, Esmaeili, Gholami, Zarei & Reichenbacher, 2012) (Arak toothcarp)
- Esmaeilius darabensis (Esmaeili, Teimori, Gholami & Reichenbacher, 2014) (Kol tooth-carp)
- Esmaeilius isfahanensis (Hrbek, Keivany & Coad, 2006)
- Esmaeilius kavirensis (Esmaeili, Teimori, Gholami & Reichenbacher, 2014)
- Esmaeilius mesopotamicus (Coad, 2009)
- Esmaeilius persicus (J. T. Jenkins, 1910) (Farsi tooth-carp)
- Esmaeilius pluristriatus (Jenkins, 1910)
- Esmaeilius shirini (Gholami, Esmaeili, Erpenbeck & Reichenbacher, 2014) (Shirin tooth-carp)
- Esmaeilius sophiae (Heckel, 1847) (Soffia tooth-carp)
- Esmaeilius vladykovi (Coad, 1988) (Veladykov's tooth-carp)
