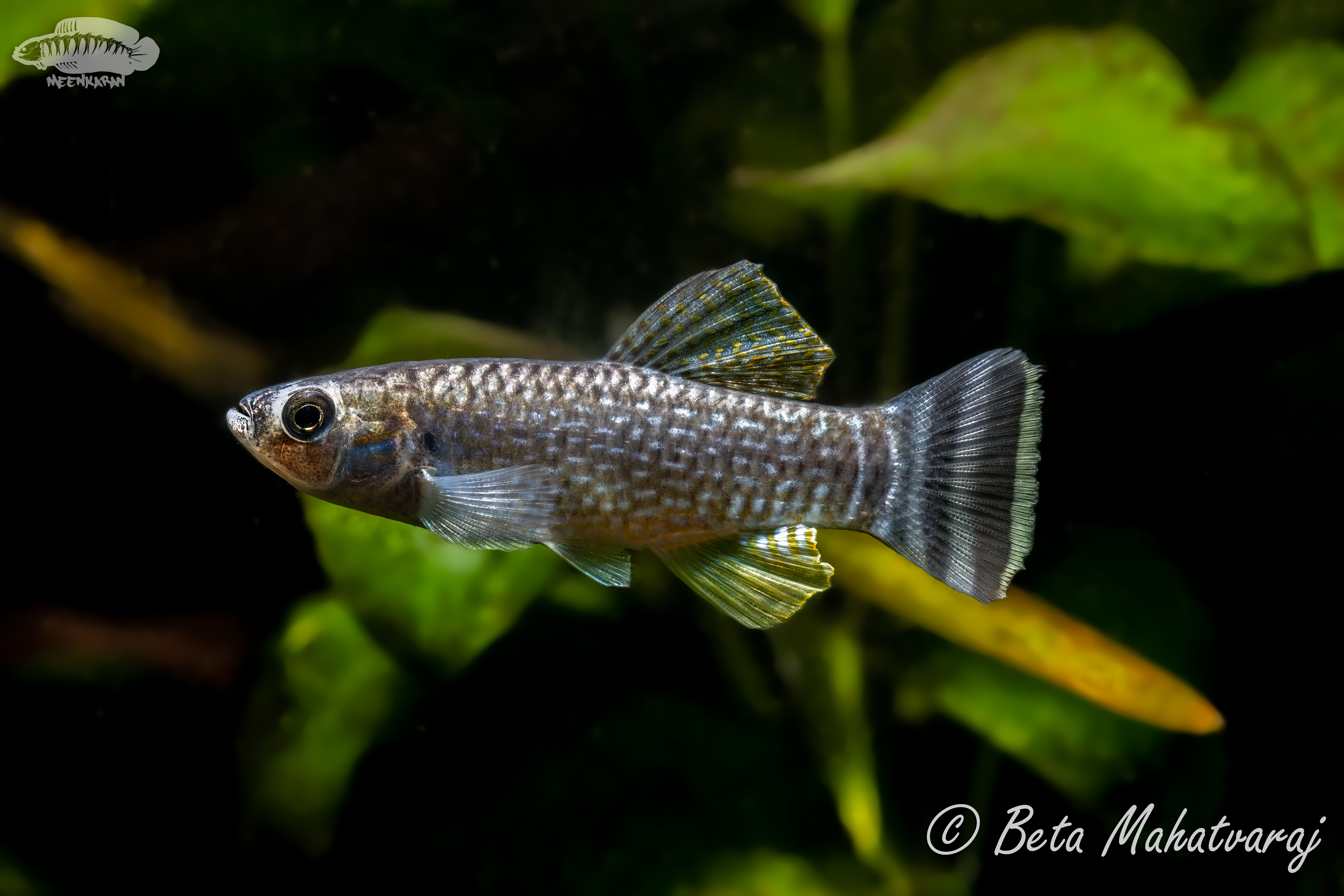
- Aphaniops stoliczkanus

Scientific classification
- Kingdom: Animalia
- Phylum: Chordata
- Class: Actinopterygii
- Order: Cyprinodontiformes
- Family: Aphaniidae
- Genus: Aphaniops; Hoedeman, 1951

Type species
- Aphanius dispar (Nardo, 1827)

= Aphaniops =

Genus of fishes

Aphaniops is a genus of killifishes in the family Aphaniidae, which are native to Western Asia (including Asia Minor and Iran), Northeast Africa and east to southwest India. Several species in the genus have very limited distribution and may be threatened.

== Etymology ==
The generic name is derived from Aphanius, and ὄψις -opsis meaning "appearance". It is a sister genus to Aphanius and Paraphanius.

=== Species ===
There are nine valid species:

- Aphaniops dispar Rüppell, 1829 (Arabian toothcarp)
- Aphaniops furcatus Teimori, Esmaeili, Erpenbeck & Reichenbacher, 2014
- Aphaniops ginaonis Holly, 1929
- Aphaniops hormuzensis (Teimori, Esmaeili, Hamidan & Reichenbacher, 2018)
- Aphaniops kruppi (Freyhof, Weissenbacher & Geiger, 2017)
- Aphaniops richardsoni (Boulenger, 1907) (Dead Sea toothcarp)
- Aphaniops sirhani Villwock, Scholl & Krupp, 1983 (Azraq toothcarp)
- Aphaniops stiassnyae Getahun & Lazara, 2001 (Lake Afdera killifish)
- Aphaniops stoliczkanus (Day, 1872)
