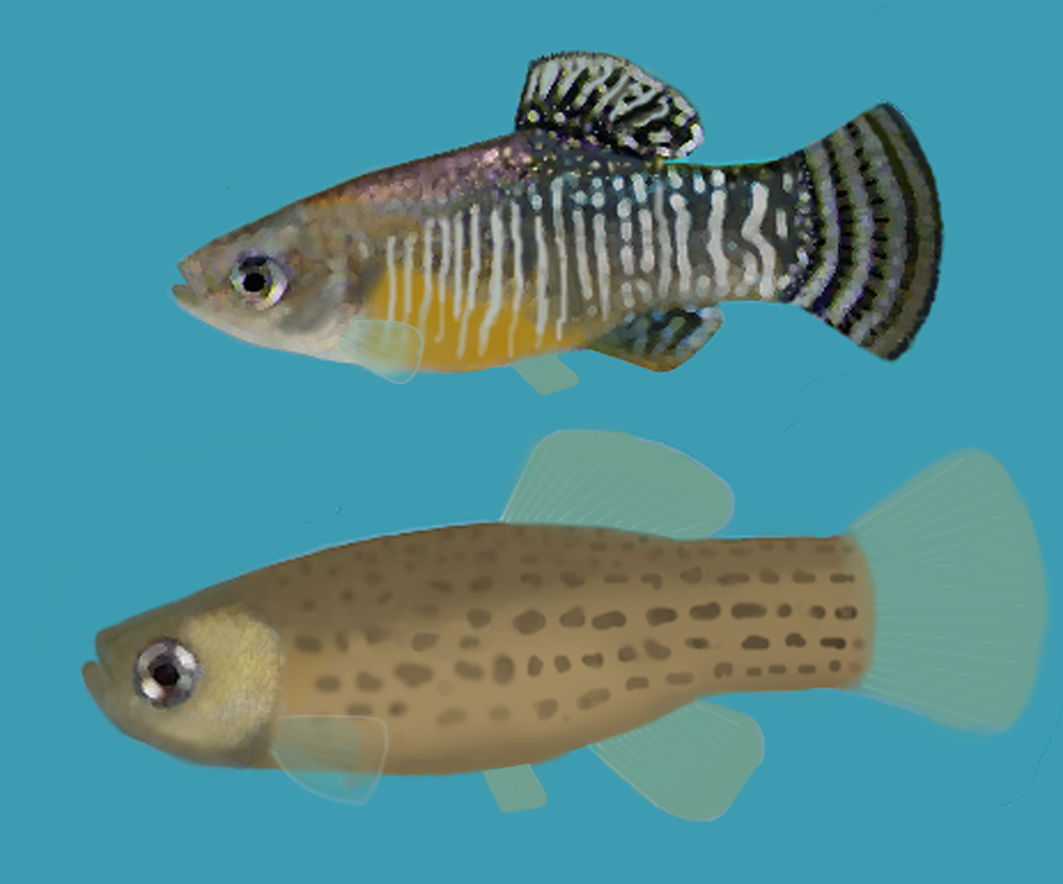
- Apricaphanius iberus

Scientific classification
- Domain: Eukaryota
- Kingdom: Animalia
- Phylum: Chordata
- Class: Actinopterygii
- Order: Cyprinodontiformes
- Family: Aphaniidae
- Genus: Apricaphanius; Freyhof & Yoğurtçuoğlu, 2020

Type species
- Lebias iberus Valenciennes in Cuvier & Valenciennes, 1846

= Apricaphanius =

Genus of fishes

Apricaphanius is a genus of killifishes in the family Aphaniidae, which are native to northern Africa and southern Europe. All species in the genus have very small distributions and are seriously threatened.

== Etymology ==
The generic name is derived from apricus, "shining", referring to many small white spots on flanks of males, and Aphanius, the genus from which they were split in 2020.

=== Species ===
There are three valid species:

- Apricaphanius baeticus (Doadrio, Carmona & Fernández-Delgado, 2002)
- Apricaphanius iberus (Valenciennes, 1846) (Spanish toothcarp)
- Apricaphanius saourensis (Blanco, Hrbek & Doadrio, 2006) (Sahara aphanius)
