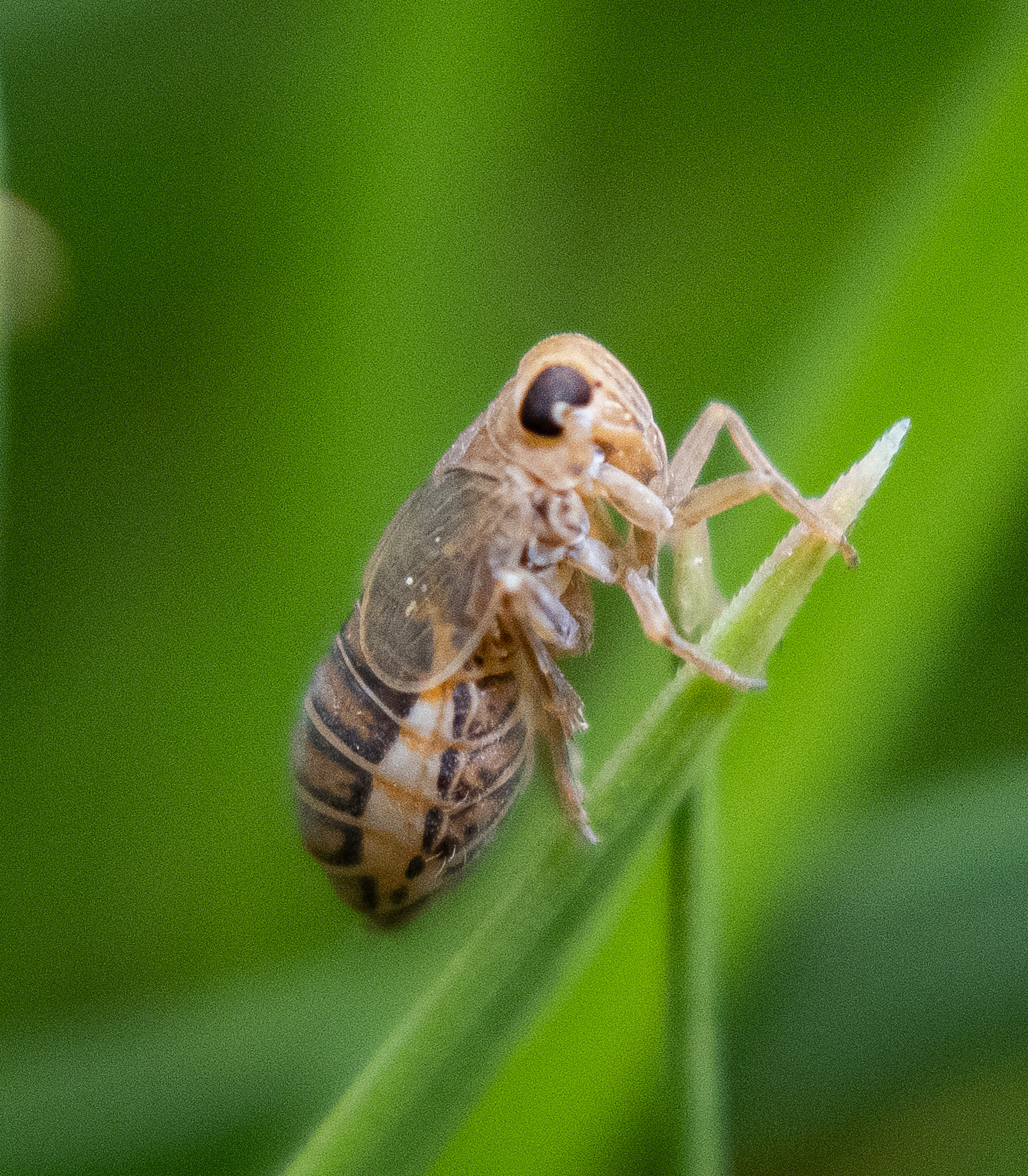

Scientific classification
- Domain: Eukaryota
- Kingdom: Animalia
- Phylum: Arthropoda
- Class: Insecta
- Order: Hemiptera
- Suborder: Auchenorrhyncha
- Infraorder: Fulgoromorpha
- Family: Delphacidae
- Genus: Kosswigianella
- Species: K. lutulenta

Binomial name
- Kosswigianella lutulenta (Van Duzee, 1897)

Synonyms
- Liburnia lutulenta Van Duzee, 1894

= Kosswigianella lutulenta =

Species of true bug

Kosswigianella lutulenta is a species of delphacid planthoppers in the family Delphacidae. It is found in the Caribbean and North America.
