= Anatolichthys marassantensis =

Scientific classification
- Domain: Eukaryota
- Kingdom: Animalia
- Phylum: Chordata
- Class: Actinopterygii
- Order: Cyprinodontiformes
- Family: Aphaniidae
- Genus: Anatolichthys
- Species: A. marassantensis

Binomial name
- Anatolichthys marassantensis Pfleiderer, Geiger & Herder, 2014

Species of pupfish found in Turkey

Anatolichthys marassantensis, also known as the Kızılırmak toothcarp, is a species of killifish in the family Aphaniidae endemic to the basin of the Kızılırmak River in Turkey. The species is named after Marassanta, the Hittite language word for the Kızılırmak.
