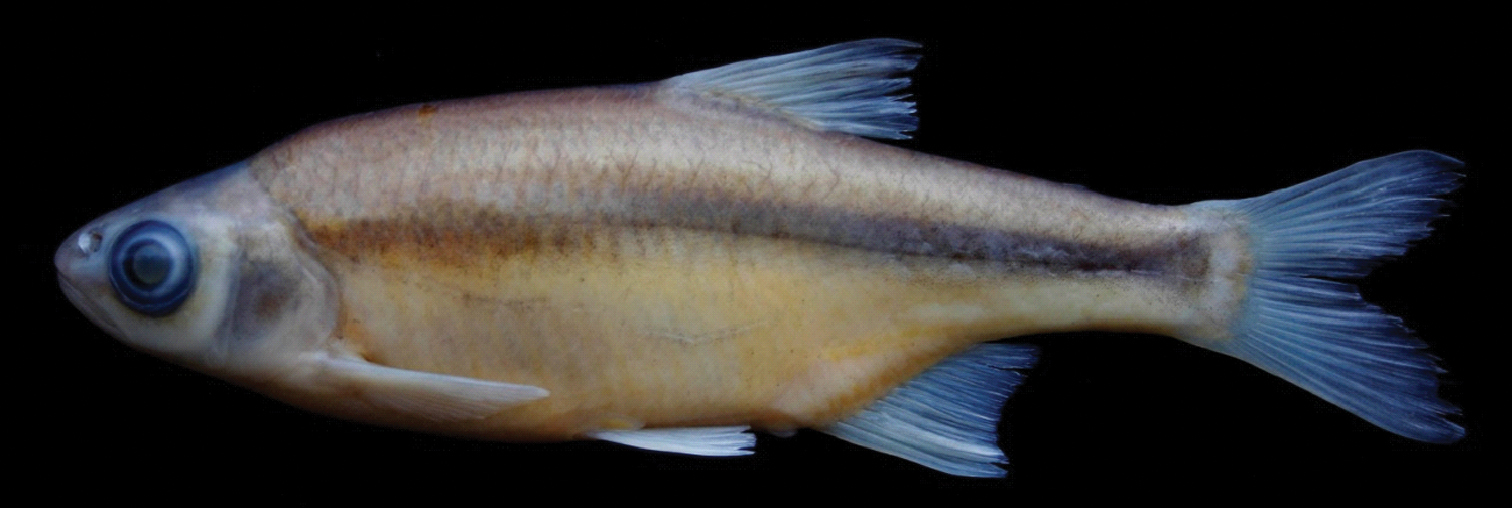

Conservation status
- Least Concern (IUCN 3.1)

Scientific classification
- Kingdom: Animalia
- Phylum: Chordata
- Class: Actinopterygii
- Order: Cypriniformes
- Family: Leuciscidae
- Subfamily: Leuciscinae
- Genus: Alburnoides
- Species: A. manyasensis

Binomial name
- Alburnoides manyasensis Turan, Ekmekçi, Kaya & Güçlü, 2013

= Manyas spirlin =

Species of fish

The Manyas spirlin (Alburnoides manyasensis) is a species of freshwater ray-finned fish belonging to the family Leuciscidae. This fish is endemic to the Simav River drainage of Lake Kuş, also known as Lake Manyas, in Turkey. It may become threatened as its range is densely inhabited and increasingly industrialized.

== See also ==
- Data related to Alburnoides manyasensis at Wikispecies
