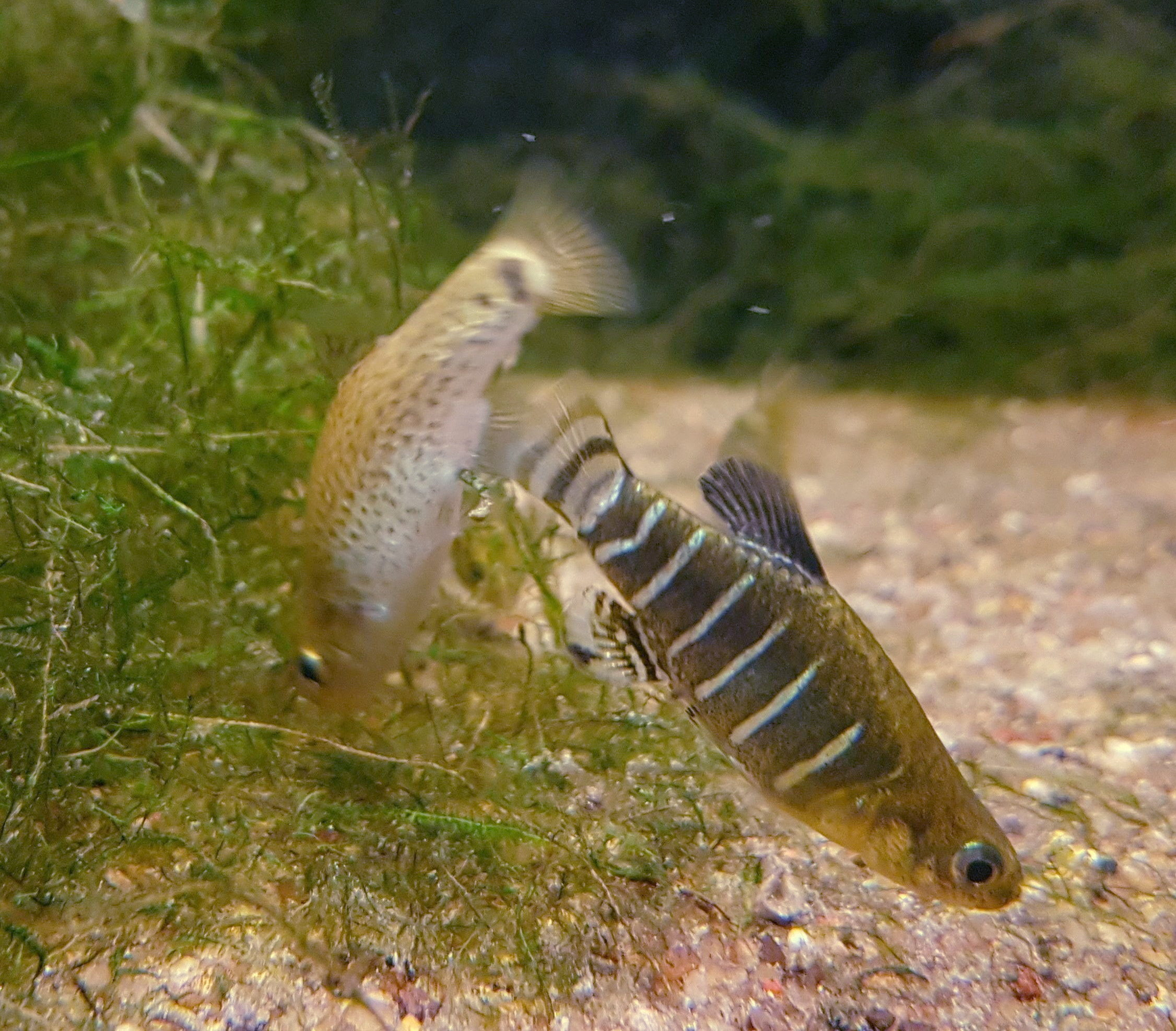
- Anatolichthys danfordii (male right, female left)

Conservation status
- Critically Endangered (IUCN 3.1)

Scientific classification
- Kingdom: Animalia
- Phylum: Chordata
- Class: Actinopterygii
- Order: Cyprinodontiformes
- Family: Aphaniidae
- Genus: Anatolichthys
- Species: A. danfordii

Binomial name
- Anatolichthys danfordii (Boulenger, 1890)

Synonyms
- Aphanius chantrei (Gaillard, 1895); Aphanius danfordii (Boulenger, 1890); Cyprinodon danfordii Boulenger, 1890; Lebias danfordi (Boulenger, 1890)

= Anatolichthys danfordii =

Species of fish

Anatolichthys danfordii, the Kızılırmak toothcarp or Sultan Sazlığı toothcarp, is a species of killifish belonging to the family Aphaniidae. It is endemic to the Kızılırmak River and the upper Seyhan River drainage systems and is now restricted to a few locations in the Sultan Sazlığı marshes. Though little data is available, the population of the fish seems to be declining. The International Union for Conservation of Nature has rated its conservation status as being "critically endangered" and fears it may become extinct in the wild if the drainage of the marshes continues.

== Distribution ==
It is endemic to Turkey and distributes in the drainage systems of the Kızılırmak River and in the upper Seyhan River, but further investigations are needed.

== Description ==
The Kızılırmak toothcarp shows sexual dimorphism like all Anatolichthys species. Males have nine to twelve dark grey-black bars on the sides of the body, a dark blue-black dorsal fin and colourless to yellow caudal and anal fin with two or three black lines at the margins. Females have silver-grey body with a large number of dark grey spots. The largest spot is always centered on the base of the caudal fin. All fins are colorless.

== Habitat ==
The Kızılırmak toothcarp lives in small springs, swamps, marches and still parts of the streams.

== Biology ==
Anatolichthys danfordii is not a seasonal killifish and its longevity reaches up to five years. It has a long spawning period which takes place from May to the end of August. Their eggs are adhesive and are attached on aquatic plants in small patches. Its growth rate and batch-spawning reproductive strategy give A. danfordii a highly competitive ability for survival in its environment.

== Status ==
The Sultan Sazlığı marshes in the Develi depression in which this fish lives are drying out as water is abstracted for agricultural purposes, putting the continued survival of this fish at risk. The International Union for Conservation of Nature has rated its conservation status as "critically endangered" and fears it may become extinct in the wild if drainage of the marshes continues.

== Species description and naming ==
Anatolichthys danfordii was described by George Boulenger as Lebias danfordii in 1890 with the type locality given as Albistan. The specific name honours the Scottish artist, sportsman and ornithologist Charles George Danford (1843–1928) who collected the type.
