= Apricaphanius saourensis =

Conservation status
- Critically endangered, possibly extinct in the wild (IUCN 3.1)

Scientific classification
- Kingdom: Animalia
- Phylum: Chordata
- Class: Actinopterygii
- Order: Cyprinodontiformes
- Family: Aphaniidae
- Genus: Apricaphanius
- Species: A. saourensis

Binomial name
- Apricaphanius saourensis (Blanco, Hrbek & Doadrio, 2006)

Synonyms
- Aphanius saourensis Blanco, Hrbek & Doadrio, 2006

Species of fish

Apricaphanius saourensis, the Sahara aphanius or Sahara killifish, is a species of freshwater pupfish belonging to the family Aphaniidae. It is endemic to the Oued Saoura river basin in Algeria. The species is threatened by water pollution and water withdrawal for agricultural use. It was last observed in the wild in 2003. Later surveys have not encountered the species, although a captive population exists; it was last evaluated by the IUCN 2021 and listed as critically endangered, possibly extinct in the wild.

== Etymology ==
The species name, saourensis, comes from "Saoura", the valley where the fish was collected.

== Description ==
Like all members of the genus Apricaphanius, the Sahara aphanius exhibits sexual dimorphism. Females possess brown mottling on their flanks and have transparent fins, whereas the much smaller males have bluish silver body mottling. Their fins have dark bars on them and are often blue in colour. Males grow to 32 mm (1.3 in) and females to 34 mm (1.3 in) in standard length.
