= Lake Kuş =

Lake in Turkey

Lake Manyas
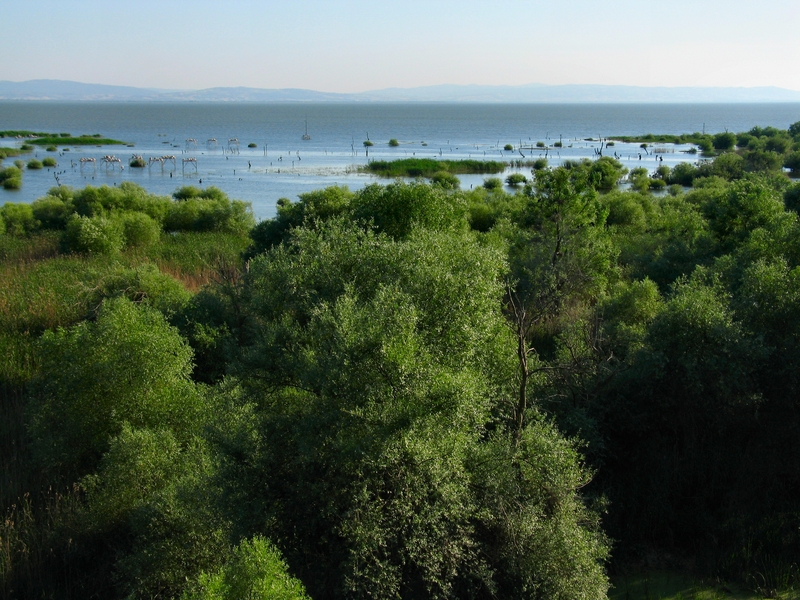

- Location within Turkey
- Location: Balıkesir
- Coordinates: 40°11′N 27°58′E
- Basin countries: Turkey
- Surface area: 160 km^{2} (62 sq mi)
- Average depth: 3 m (9.8 ft)
- Surface elevation: 18 m (59 ft)

Ramsar Wetland
- Official name: Lake Kus
- Designated: 13 July 1994
- Reference no.: 660

Lake Kuş (Turkish: Kuş Gölü, lit. 'Bird Lake') or Lake Manyas (Turkish: Manyas Gölü) is a lake in western Turkey, located in the Bandırma region. It is a shallow nutrient-rich freshwater lake (average depth 3 m) fed by groundwater and four streams. Small deltas have formed where the latter enter the lake, comprising extensive marshes and tree-lined riverbanks. Narrow belts of reed Phragmites fringe much of the lake. Water is abstracted for factory use and for irrigation. Cattle and sheep grazing are common along the lake shores.

== Overview ==
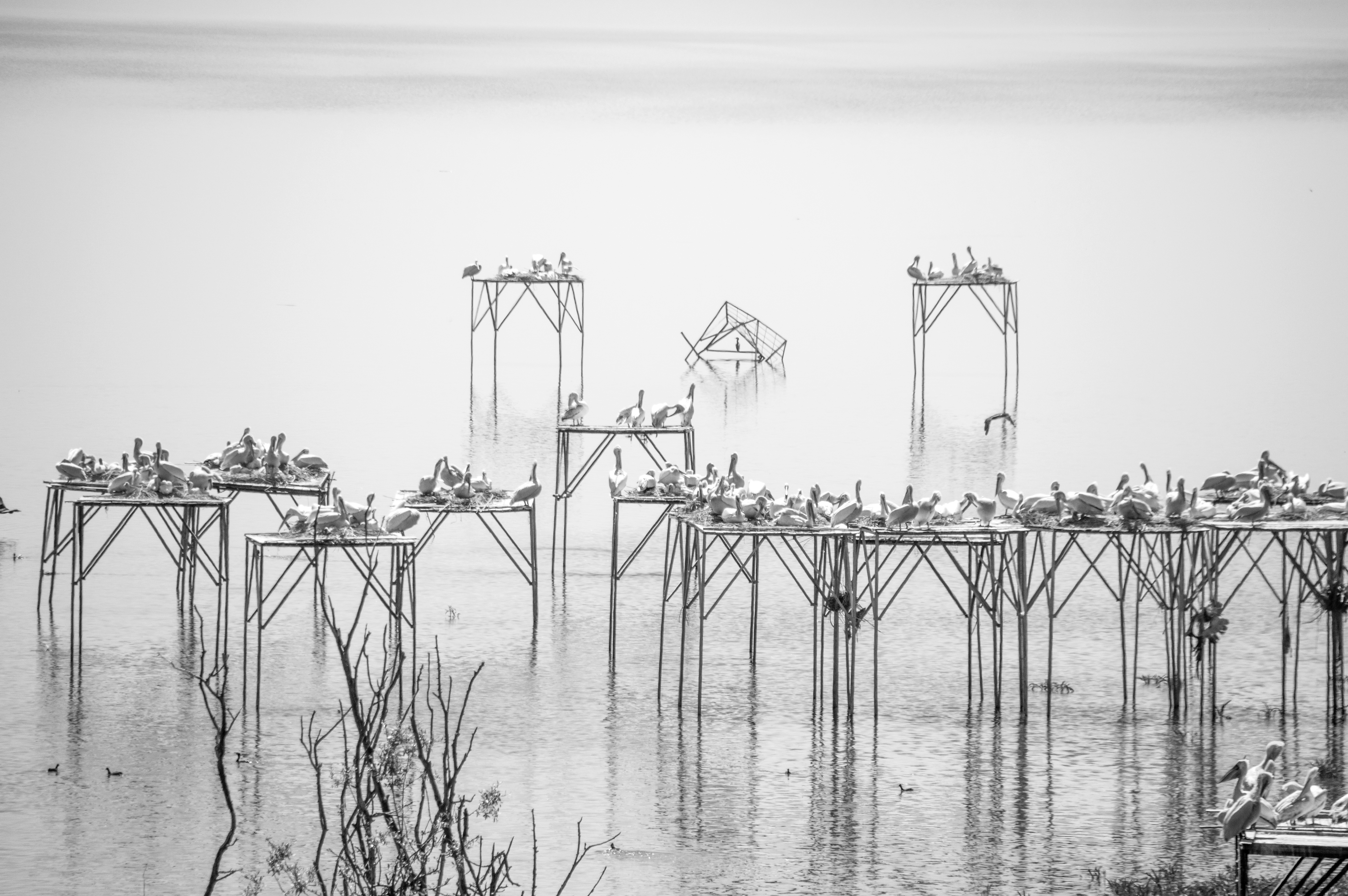
taken from Manyas Bird Paradise Observation Tower

Manyas Lake is an important site for breeding and wintering waterbirds. In 1938 the Kuş Cenneti (Turkish for "Bird Paradise") nature reserve was set up by the German zoologist and hydrologist Curt Kosswig who worked in Turkey from 1937–1955. This 64 hectare sanctuary occupies a largely unspoiled area of the lakeside near Sığırcık in the northeast corner of the lake. It has a small ornithological museum of stuffed birds in poor condition, remote-controlled viewing cameras, and an observation tower erected by the Hydrology Department of the University of Istanbul in 1952.

More than 270 species of birds have been recorded at the lake. Important bird species include white-headed duck (Oxyura leucocephala), Eurasian spoonbill (Platalea leucorodia), greater flamingo (Phoenicopterus roseus), plus breeding populations of the vulnerable Dalmatian pelican (Pelecanus crispus). Migrating great white pelicans (Pelecanus onocrotalus) often roost at the lake. The Manyas spirlin is a species of cyprinid fish which is endemic to this lake's drainage basin.

== Conservation issues ==
High threats include agricultural use and intensification, drainage and dam construction. Artificially high water-levels have resulted in the loss of feeding marshes. Nesting trees in the National Park have also begun to die as a result of prolonged inundation. Agricultural, industrial and household pollution enters the lake in large quantities. Due to over-fishing, disease, pollution and possibly the effects of the changing water regime, fish catches have declined drastically. Fish migration into the lake is now impossible following the construction of a regulator.

== See also ==
- Kuşcenneti National Park
- Bandırma
- List of lakes in Turkey
