= Dead Sea toothcarp =

Conservation status
- Endangered (IUCN 3.1)

Scientific classification
- Kingdom: Animalia
- Phylum: Chordata
- Class: Actinopterygii
- Order: Cyprinodontiformes
- Family: Aphaniidae
- Genus: Aphaniops
- Species: A. richardsoni

Binomial name
- Aphaniops richardsoni (Boulenger, 1907)

Synonyms
- Aphanius richardsoni (Boulenger, 1907); Cyprinodon richardsoni Boulenger, 1907; Aphanius dispar richardsoni

Species of fish

The Dead Sea toothcarp (Aphaniops richardsoni) is a species of toothcarp in the family Aphaniidae that is endemic to the Dead Sea basin. It is threatened by water fluctuation, and the introduction of cichlids and Gambusia. The specific name of this fish honours the Scottish surgeon and naturalist John Richardson (1787–1865) who first reported killifish in the Dead Sea basin. The Dead Sea toothcarp has been on the Red List of the International Union for Conversation of Nature since 2006.

The IUCN warns that the "exploitation of spring waters and climate change" are major threats facing the 4-centimeter (1.6 in) long, silver-coloured fish.
