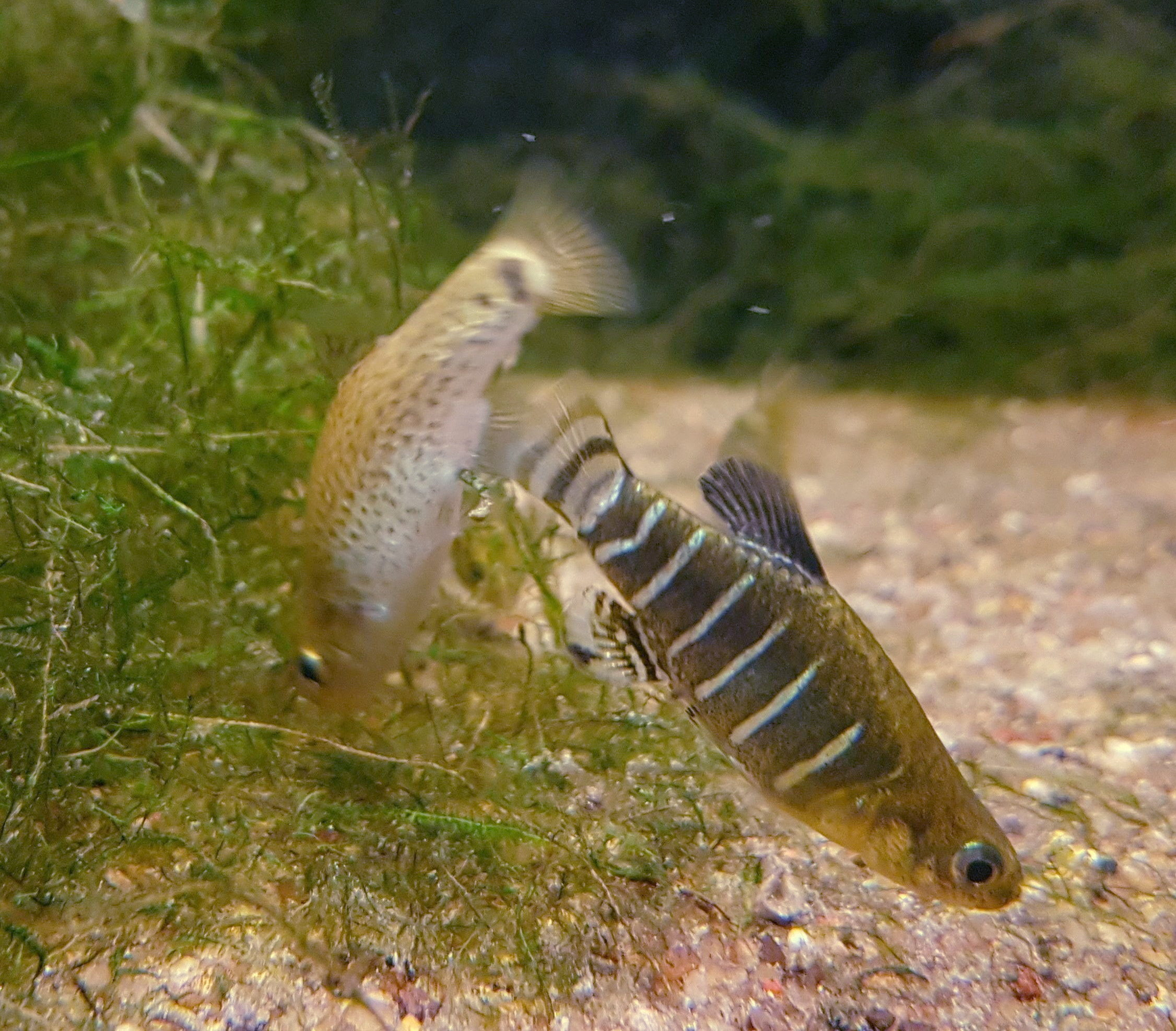
- Anatolichthys danfordii

Scientific classification
- Kingdom: Animalia
- Phylum: Chordata
- Class: Actinopterygii
- Order: Cyprinodontiformes
- Family: Aphaniidae
- Genus: Anatolichthys; Kosswig & Sözer, 1945

Type species
- Anatolichthys splendens Kosswig & Sözer, 1945

Synonyms
- Turkichthys Ermin, 1946

= Anatolichthys =

Genus of fishes

Anatolichthys is a genus of toothcarps in the family Aphaniidae, which are native to Asia Minor. Several species in the genus have very limited distribution and may be threatened.

== Etymology ==
The generic name is derived from Anatolia, a name for the Asian part of Turkey and ichthys "fish".

=== Species ===
There are fourteen valid species:

- Anatolichthys anatoliae Leidenfrost, 1912 (Lake Tuz toothcarp)
- Anatolichthys chantrei (Gaillard, 1895)
- Anatolichthys danfordii Boulenger, 1890 (Sultan Sazlığı toothcarp)
- Anatolichthys fontinalis Akşiray, 1948
- Anatolichthys iconii Akşiray, 1948
- Anatolichthys irregularis (Yoğurtçuoğlu & Freyhof, 2018)
- Anatolichthys maeandricus Akşiray, 1948
- Anatolichthys marassantensis Pfleiderer, Geiger & Herder, 2014 (Kızılırmak toothcarp)
- Anatolichthys meridionalis Akşiray, 1948
- Anatolichthys saldae Akşiray, 1955
- †Anatolichthys splendens Kosswig & Sözer, 1945 (Splendid toothcarp)
- Anatolichthys sureyanus W. Neu, 1937 (Burdur toothcarp)
- Anatolichthys transgrediens Ermin, 1946 (Acıgöl toothcarp)
- Anatolichthys villwocki Hrbek & Wildekamp, 2003 (Sakarya toothcarp)
