= Kuşcenneti National Park =

National park in northwestern Turkey

- Kuşcenneti Milli Parkı
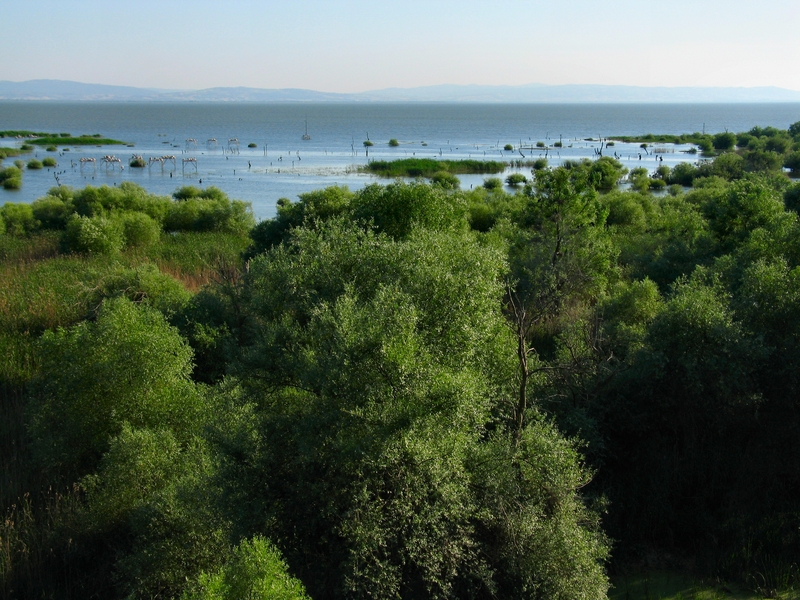
- Kuşcenneti National Patk and Lake Kuş
- Location: Bandırma, Balıkesir Province, Turkey
- Nearest city: Balıkesir
- Area: 24,047 ha (59,420 acres)
- Established: 31 August 1959
- Governing body: Ministry of Forest and Water Management

Ramsar Wetland
- Official name: Kuşcenneti National Park
- Designated: 1994

Kuşcenneti National Park (Turkish: Kuşcenneti Milli Parkı), established on 31 August 1959, is a national park located northeast of the Lake Kuş in Bandırma district of Balıkesir Province, northwestern Turkey.

== Overview ==
Kuşcenneti National Park, literally "Bird Paradise National Park", is located at the Lake Kuş, literally "Lake Bird", also known as Lake Manyas, and is 18 km (11 mi) far from Bandırma district of Balıkesir Province in northwestern Turkey.

== History ==
Historically, Lydians settled from the 8th century BCE on in the southeast region of the Lake Kuş. Later, following the Persian invasion of Anatolia, the region was called Paradeisos, and used as a hunting ground and park for Persian kings.

German zoologist professor Curt Kosswig (1903–1982) and his biologist spouse Leonore (1904–1973), working at Istanbul University's Faculty of Science, visited the region in 1939. They watched the bird communities nesting in the willow grove. In 1952, he set up a biology station in the region, assigned a station guard to protect the area. Until 1959, the field was protected by the efforts of the couple. On 31 August 1959, the Cabinet of Turkey declared an area of 52 ha (130 acres) as national park. On 20 June 1975, the Government expropriated an area of 12.1 ha (30 acres) to be included in the national park. In 1976, he Council of Europe awarded a Class A European certificate for the successful conservation practice within the definition of the national park. It was renewed in 1981, 1986, 1991 and 1996. In 1981, the area was declared "First Degree Natural Site", and as such its administration was taken over by the Ministry of Culture and Tourism. In 1994, with Turkey's approval of the Ramsar Convention, Convention on Wetlands of International Importance Especially as Waterfowl Habitat, the Kuşcenneti National Park and Lake Kuş were registered as a Ramsar area and included in the List of Ramsar Wetlands of International Importance. The "Regulation for the Protection of Wetlands" was published in the Official Gazette dated 17 May 2005. The borders of the national park were published in the Official Gazette dated 21 June 2005. The national park area extended from 64.1 ha (158 acres) forest land to 24,047 ha (59,420 acres) including an average of 16,400 ha (41,000 acres) lake area. The National Wetlands Commission approved Lake Kuş Wetland Protection Area on 28 December 2005.

== Ecosystem ==
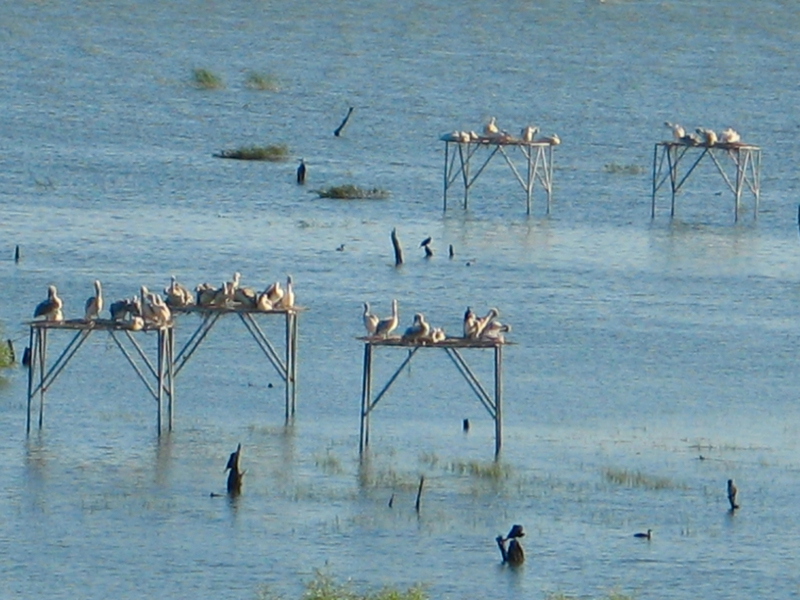
Great white pelicans (Pelecanus onocrotalus) in the lake Kuş.

The Kuşcenneti National Park is one of the most important ornithologically important national parks of Turkey. It is located on the bird migration routes between the continents of Asia, Europe and Africa. It is of international importance in terms of biodiversity, contains important ecosystems consisting of flooded willow and ash tree communities, fresh water lakes, wet meadows and reeds.

Two to three million birds out of 239 bird species that hatch, winter and stop by during migration visit here every year. Some bird species breeding in the national park are great crested grebe (Podiceps cristatus), little grebe (Tachybaptus ruficollis), Dalmatian pelican (Pelecanus crispus), great cormorant (Phalacrocorax carbo), pygmy cormorant (Phalacrocorax pygmeus), grey heron (Ardea cinerea), great egret (Casmerodius albus), Eurasian bittern (Botaurus stellaris), common shelduck (Tadorna tadorna), ruddy shelduck (Tadorna ferruginea), mallard (Anas platyrhynchos), gadwall (Anas strepera), Eurasian teal (Anas crecca), red-crested pochard (Netta rufina), spotted flycatcher (Muscicapa striata), fieldfare (Turdus pilaris), spotted redshank (Tringa erythropus), common greenshank (Tringa nebularia), back-tailed godwit (Limosa limosa), common pochard (^Aythya ferina), ferruginous duck ( Aythya nyroca), Eurasian sparrowhawk (Accipiter nisus), European honey buzzard (Pernis apivorus), western marsh harrier (Circus aeruginosus), water rail (Rallus aquaticus), common moorhen (Gallinula chloropus), Eurasian coot (Fulica atra), Kentish plover (Charadrius alexandrinus), grey plover (Pluvialis squatarola), northern lapwing (Vanellus vanellus), spur-winged lapwing (Vanellus spinosus), common redshank (Tringa totanus), northern pintail (Anas acuta), northern shoveler (Anas clypeata), jack snipe (Lymnocryptes minimus), black-headed gull (Larus ridibundus), little gull (Larus minutus), great spotted woodpecker (Dendrocopos major), white wagtail (Motacilla alba), Eurasian woodcock (Scolopax rusticola).
