= Apricaphanius baeticus =

Conservation status
- Near Threatened (IUCN 3.1)

Scientific classification
- Kingdom: Animalia
- Phylum: Chordata
- Class: Actinopterygii
- Order: Cyprinodontiformes
- Family: Aphaniidae
- Genus: Apricaphanius
- Species: A. baeticus

Binomial name
- Apricaphanius baeticus Doadrio, Carmona & Fernández-Delgado, 2002
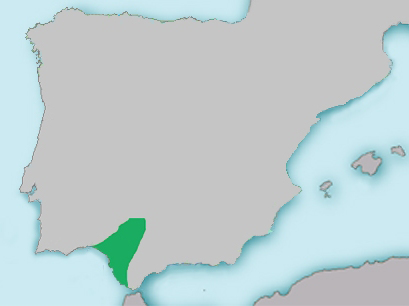

Species of fish

Apricaphanius baeticus is a species of fish in the family Aphaniidae. It is endemic to a small part of Southern Spain, between the Gulf of Cadiz and Huelva. Its natural habitats are rivers, estuarine waters, and coastal saline lagoons. It is threatened by habitat loss and by invasive species.
