= Sadí de Buen Lozano =

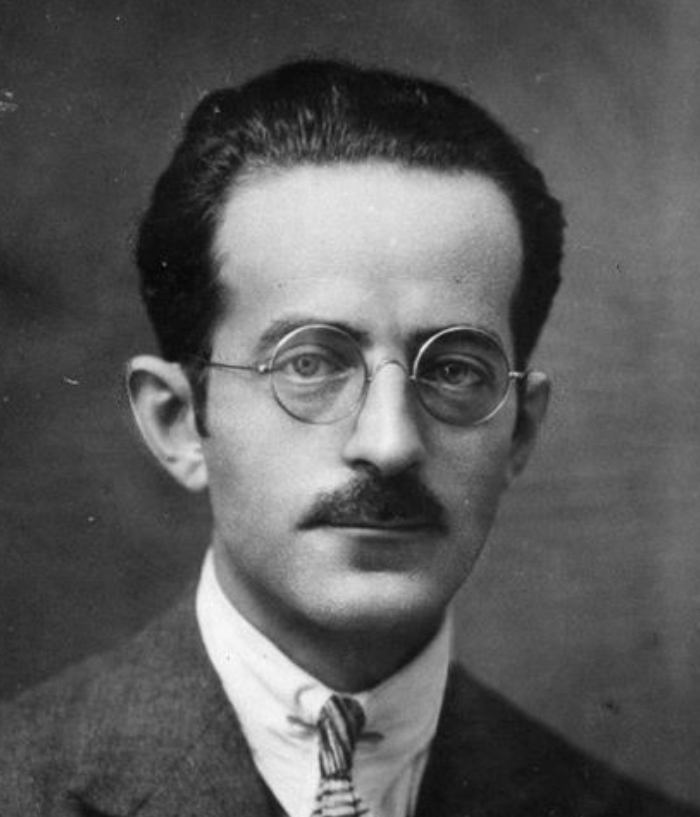
- Sadi de Buen Lozano circa 1933
- Born: Sadí Odón de Buen Lozano; July 18, 1893; Barcelona, Spain
- Died: September 3, 1936 (aged 43); Córdoba, Spain
- Cause of death: Execution by firing squad
- Occupations: Physician; Parasitologist; Public health official
- Known for: Eradication of malaria in Spain, discovery of Borrelia hispanica, introduction of Gambusia fish in Europe
- Spouse: Berta López de Heredia
- Children: 4
- Parent(s): Odón de Buen y del Cos (father), Rafaela Lozano Rey (mother)

Sadi de Buen Lozano (18 July 1893 – 3 September 1936) was a Spanish physician and parasitologist, notable for his efforts in the study and eradication of malaria in Spain, his discovery of the agent and vector of Spanish relapsing fever, a form of borreliosis, and his role in introducing the mosquito-eating fish Gambusia affinis to Europe as a biological control method. He was executed by Nationalist forces at the beginning of the Spanish Civil War.

He is considered a pioneer of social medicine in Spain and one of the most important public health figures of the early 20th century. His work was largely forgotten during the Franco dictatorship and has only begun to be reassessed in recent years.

== Biography ==
Sadí de Buen Lozano was born on 18 July 1893 in Barcelona, where his father held the Chair of Natural History. He was the son of Odón de Buen y del Cos, founder of the Spanish Institute of Oceanography, and Rafaela Lozano Rey, sister of the distinguished ichthyologist Luis Lozano Rey. His siblings included Demófilo, a prominent jurist; Fernando and Rafael, who distinguished themselves in oceanography; Victor, an industrial and aeronautical engineer; and Eliseo, who also became an antimalarial physician and collaborated in his research.

He completed his medical studies at the Central University of Madrid in 1916 with an outstanding academic record and received his doctorate in 1918 with a thesis on leprosy. From 1920 he trained in medical parasitology under Italian researcher Gustavo Pittaluga Fattorini, professor of the specialty in Madrid.

He married Berta López de Heredia, daughter of the Riojan wine producer López Heredia, creator of Viña Tondonia. They had four children, who grew up in Mexico after the Civil War. His son, Dr. Sadí de Buen López de Heredia, became a leading figure in ophthalmology, and his son Óscar, a civil engineer, received the National Prize for Civil Engineering in Mexico in 1999.

In 1931 he was appointed Director General of Sanitary Institutions, becoming a trusted associate of Marcelino Pascua, Director General of Health, whom he substituted during absences. He was a member of the Physicians' Union of the UGT and in 1933 joined the Socialist Party in its Madrid branch.

=== Death ===
De Buen was in Cordoba in July 1936, carrying out antimalarial research duties and serving as head of the services of the Dirección General de Sanidad, when he was arrested on 23 July. He was executed by firing squad on the night of 2–3 September 1936 at the walls of the San Rafael Cemetery, Cordoba by Nationalist insurgents. His death had wide repercussions across Europe, which likely contributed to the release, through prisoner exchange, of his father Odon de Buen, who had been caught by the military uprising in Mallorca.

== Scientific career ==
De Buen devoted himself primarily to combating malaria, both through basic research and practical action. He collaborated with Pittaluga on antimalarial work first in Catalonia and later in Caceres. He joined the Alfonso XIII Institute of Hygiene and served as a member of the Central Antimalarial Commission. From 1920 he directed the establishment of 32 antimalarial dispensaries across Spain, and in 1924 founded and directed the Instituto Antipalafico de Navalmoral de la Mata, which became an international reference point in the fight against malaria. He was also a Rockefeller Foundation fellow in the United States and Italy, and supervised Rockefeller Foundation work in Italy and the School of Tropical Medicine in India.

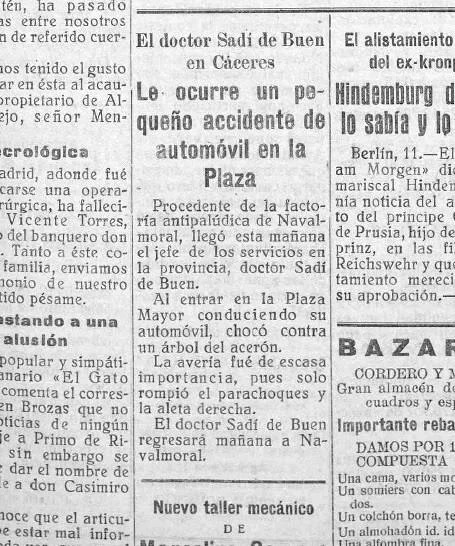
Newspaper clipping about an accident involving the doctor in Cáceres, where his car hit a tree

=== Introduction of Gambusia to Europe ===
With the help of his brother Fernando, a naturalist specialising in aquatic life, Sadi de Buen introduced the American species Gambusia affinis to Europe in 1921. This small carnivorous fish, native to rivers flowing into the Gulf of Mexico, was supposed to feed voraciously on mosquito larvae near the water surface. De Buen identified the streams of Talayuela (Caceres) as a suitable site for acclimatisation, which had until then proved impossible. From there a network of breeding stations was established across all malaria-affected provinces, and the fish were subsequently used to combat malaria in Italy and later across Europe and North Africa. Actually, the fish also eats other larvae and competes with local mosquito eaters. It is now considered an invasive species.

=== Discovery of Borrelia hispanica ===
De Buen discovered the bacterium Borrelia hispanica (= Treponema hispanica), which causes Spanish relapsing fever, a disease he characterised and described in full. He also identified the vector, Ornithodoros erraticus (= O. maroccanus), a tick of the family Ixodidae. The disease is endemic to the Iberian Peninsula and northwest Africa and is related to Borrelia crocidurae, found across Africa, the Middle East and Central Asia. He also studied leprosy and leishmaniasis, describing three new species of Phlebotomus.

He was a member of the Malaria Commission of the League of Nations and president of the Red Cross. He represented Spain at the malaria congresses held in Rome (1925) and Algiers (1930).

== Legacy ==
The efficient antimalarial organisation that De Buen had helped build disappeared with the Civil War. By 1942, malaria had become the most serious public health problem in Spain and a new structure had to be built almost from scratch. The circumstances of De Buen's death contributed to the neglect of his scientific legacy during the Franco era.

In 2023, in compliance with the Law of Historical Memory, the street named after him in Navalmoral de la Mata, where he founded the Instituto Antipalafico in 1924, was restored to its original name, replacing the previous name of Calle Calvo Sotelo.

In 2025, a permanent exhibition dedicated to Dr. Sadi de Buen was inaugurated at the Museum of the History of Medicine and Health of Extremadura in Zafra, coinciding with the publication of the first biography of his life, Sadi de Buen. El Lorca de la Ciencia, by Manuel Garcia Gonzalez and Pepa Corbacho Jimenez.

== See also ==
- Odon de Buen y del Cos
- Fernando de Buen y Lozano
