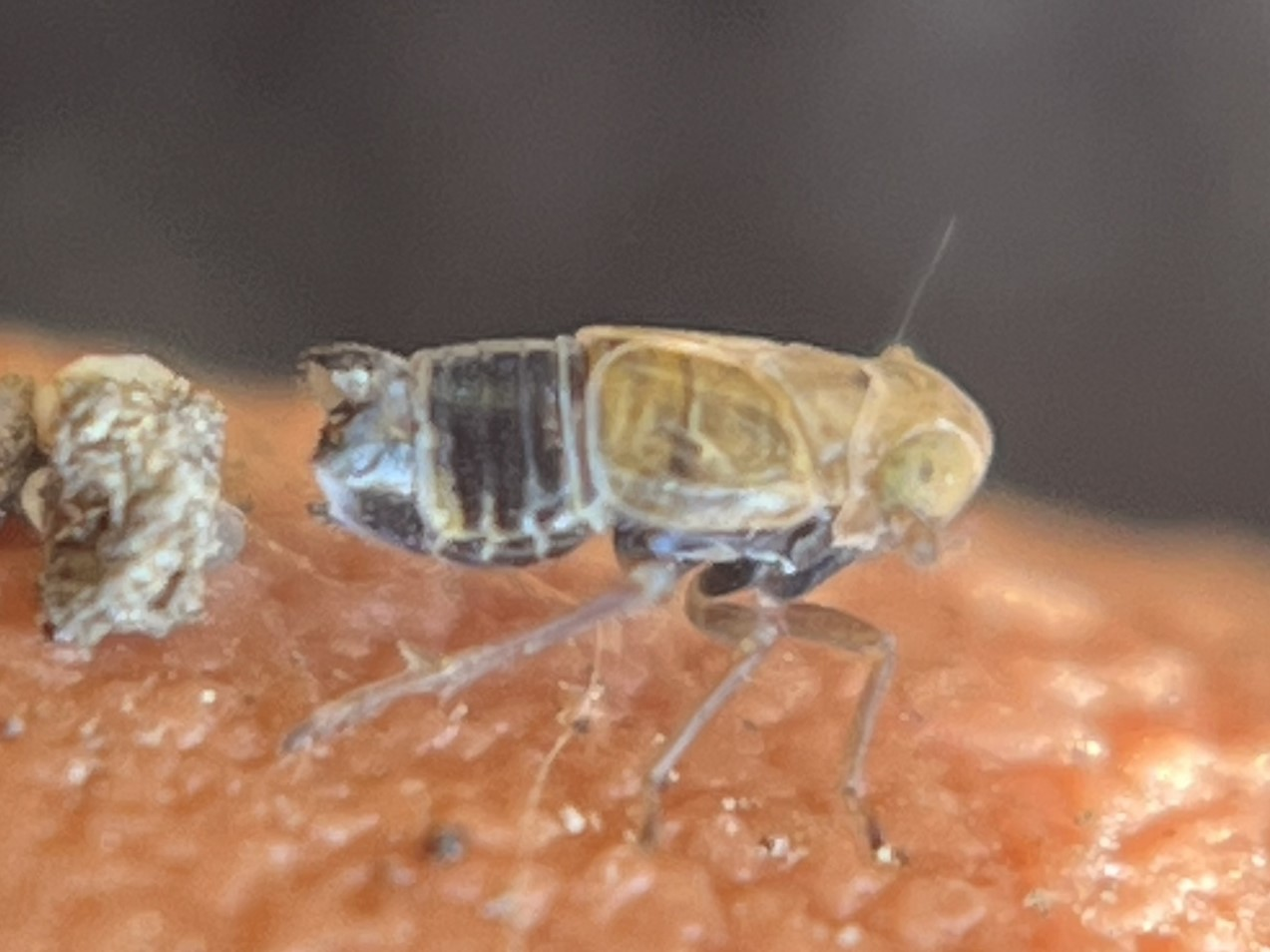

Scientific classification
- Kingdom: Animalia
- Phylum: Arthropoda
- Class: Insecta
- Order: Hemiptera
- Suborder: Auchenorrhyncha
- Infraorder: Fulgoromorpha
- Family: Delphacidae
- Genus: Kosswigianella
- Species: K. denticauda

Binomial name
- Kosswigianella denticauda (Boheman, 1847)

Synonyms
- List: Acanthodelphax denticauda (Boheman, 1847); Acanthodelphax insignis (Scott); Achorotile denticauda (Boheman, 1847); Calligypona denticauda (Boheman, 1847); Delphacodes conwentzi (Matsumura, 1906); Delphacodes denticauda (Boheman, 1847); Delphacodes insignis (Scott, 1882); Delphacodes oxyura (Haupt, 1935); Delphax conwentzi Matsumura, 1906; Delphax denticauda Boheman, 1847; Delphax insignis (Scott, 1882); Liburnia conwentzi (Matsumura, 1906); Liburnia denticauda (Boheman, 1847); Liburnia insignis Scott, 1882; Liburnia oxyura Haupt, 1935; Muirodelphax denticauda (Boheman, 1847)

= Kosswigianella denticauda =

Species of true bug

Kosswigianella denticauda is a species of planthopper belonging to the tribe Delphacini. It is native to Europe.
