= Footless killifish =

Conservation status
- Critically endangered, possibly extinct in the wild (IUCN 3.1)

Scientific classification
- Kingdom: Animalia
- Phylum: Chordata
- Class: Actinopterygii
- Order: Cyprinodontiformes
- Family: Aphaniidae
- Genus: Tellia; Gervais, 1853
- Species: T. apoda

Binomial name
- Tellia apoda Gervais, 1853

Synonyms
- Aphanius apodus (Gervais, 1853); Lebias apodus (Gervais, 1853); Aphanius thermarum (Eichwald, 1851); Poecilia thermarum (Eichwald, 1851); Lebias thermarum Eichwald, 1851

Species of fish

The footless killifish (Tellia apoda) is a monotypic species of killifish in the family Aphaniidae. This species is endemic to springs and streams in the Atlas Mountains of Algeria, between Batna and Constantine. T. apoda was described in 1853 by Paul Gervais with the type locality given as the Springs of Tell, south of Constantine.

Tellia apoda is endemic to Algeria. It is the only member of family Aphaniidae which lacks pelvic fins, which leads to the common name. This species can grow up to the average length of about 45 millimetres (2 in). Tellia apoda has the diet of eating small aquatic crustaceans, worms, insect larvae, zooplankton, algae, and occasionally plant material is eaten. If bred for the aquarium, this species can accept dried foods. Although they will eat dried food, it is better for them to be offered small live or frozen food such as Artemia, Daphnia or bloodworm. They are known to be found in freshwater.

The species was last observed in the wild in 1990. Other members of its family are fractional spawners, laying one or more eggs daily during a breeding season that peaks twice. Threats include water pollution, water extraction and invasive species such as Gambusia holbrooki.
