= Esmaeilius sophiae =

Scientific classification
- Domain: Eukaryota
- Kingdom: Animalia
- Phylum: Chordata
- Class: Actinopterygii
- Order: Cyprinodontiformes
- Family: Aphaniidae
- Genus: Esmaeilius
- Species: E. sophiae

Binomial name
- Esmaeilius sophiae (Heckel, 1847)

Synonyms
- Aphanius sophiae (Heckel, 1847); Lebias sophiae Heckel, 1847

Species of fish

Esmaeilius sophiae, the Soffia toothcarp, is a species of killifish belonging to the family Aphaniidae. It is native to Iran and Iraq which includes the Kor River basin of the Fars province in Iran, Namak lake and Tigris River basin. They are one of the subclades of the Inland and Inland-related Aphanius Species (IIRAS) and they are part of the richest of the 3 subclades. They can be found in freshwater but also occur in saline water.

== Distribution and habitat ==
The Soffia killifish is mainly herbivorous, nonmigratory, and lives near the bottom of mostly fresh bodies of water, such as rivers and springs. It can be found in Iran, has also been reported in the Tigris River basin of Iraq. A possible specimen was also collected in from Syria in 1977, though it is mainly only considered to native of Iran and Iraq. This species is also influenced by its environment in that stressors such as variations in temperature, salinity, and flooding fluctuate, which has an effect on the age, growth, and reproductive characteristics of individuals in this species.
