= Scaleless killifish =

Conservation status
- Endangered (IUCN 3.1)

Scientific classification
- Kingdom: Animalia
- Phylum: Chordata
- Class: Actinopterygii
- Division: Teleostei
- Order: Cyprinodontiformes
- Family: Aphaniidae
- Genus: Kosswigichthys
- Species: K. asquamatus

Binomial name
- Kosswigichthys asquamatus Sözer, 1842

Synonyms
- Aphanius asquamatus (Sözer, 1942); Lebias asquamatus (Sözer, 1942)

Species of fish

The scaleless killifish or Hazar toothcarp (Kosswigichthys asquamatus) is a species of freshwater fish in the family Aphaniidae. It is the only species in its genus, and is endemic to Lake Hazar in Turkey. It is a pelagic species that comes to shore in spring–early summer to spawn. It is threatened by the falling water levels of Lake Hazar due to water abstraction and reduced rainfall due to climate change.
