= Leopold von Ubisch =

German paleontologist (1886–1965)

Leopold von Ubisch (1886–1965) was a German paleontologist who surgically removed the nucleus from sea urchin eggs in 1954 to confirm an 1899 experiment by Theodor Boveri.

He was an early supporter of the continental drift theory.

== Life ==
Von Ubisch was a professor of zoology at the University of Münster from 1927 to 1935. He was then fired because his mother was Jewish. In 1945, he declined an offer to return to his chair.

He had one sister, Gerta, who was born in Metz on 3 October 1882, and died in 1965. She lectured on genetics in Heidelberg.
