= Odón de Buen y del Cos =

Spanish politician and naturalist (1863–1945)

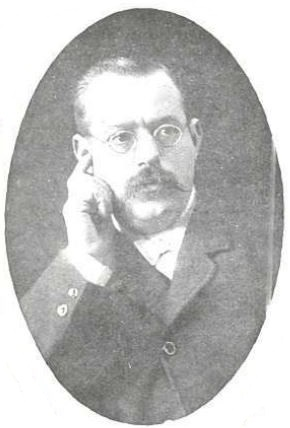
Odón de Buen y del Cos

Odón de Buen y del Cos (1863 in Zuera, Zaragoza Province, Aragon, Spain – 1945 in Mexico City) was a Spanish naturalist, politician and publicist. He founded the Spanish Institute of Oceanography (Instituto Español de Oceanografía, Santander, Cantabria), and was a senator and council-member in Barcelona.

== Career ==
Born to a tailor, de Buen studied Natural History in Madrid and Zaragoza. He became interested in oceanography after doing research on board of the Blanca fragatta. From 1889 to 1911 he taught zoology and botany at the University of Barcelona. On board of the Averroes, he studied the currents by Gibraltar. The acclimation of the Gambusia affinis, a larva-eating fish used to combat malaria is attributed to his son, parasitologist Sadí de Buen Lozano.

In 1939, like many scientists, artists and intellectuals, he left Spain for Mexico in the aftermath of the Spanish Civil War. He died in Mexico City in 1945.

== Darwinism ==
In the 1890s, de Buen promoted Darwinism in his lectures at the University of Barcelona and also published textbooks supportive of Darwinian evolution. In 1895, the Bishop of Barcelona obtained a ban from the government on the use of his textbooks at the university and a suspension of his classes. However, the majority of students supported de Buen and the issue went public and caused controversy in the streets from protests. The government retreated and the ban was eventually lifted.

== Publications ==
- De Kristiania a Tuggurt (1887)
- Materiales para la fauna carcinológica de España (1887)
- Botánica: con inclusión de la geografía botánica (1894)
- Historia natural (1896)
