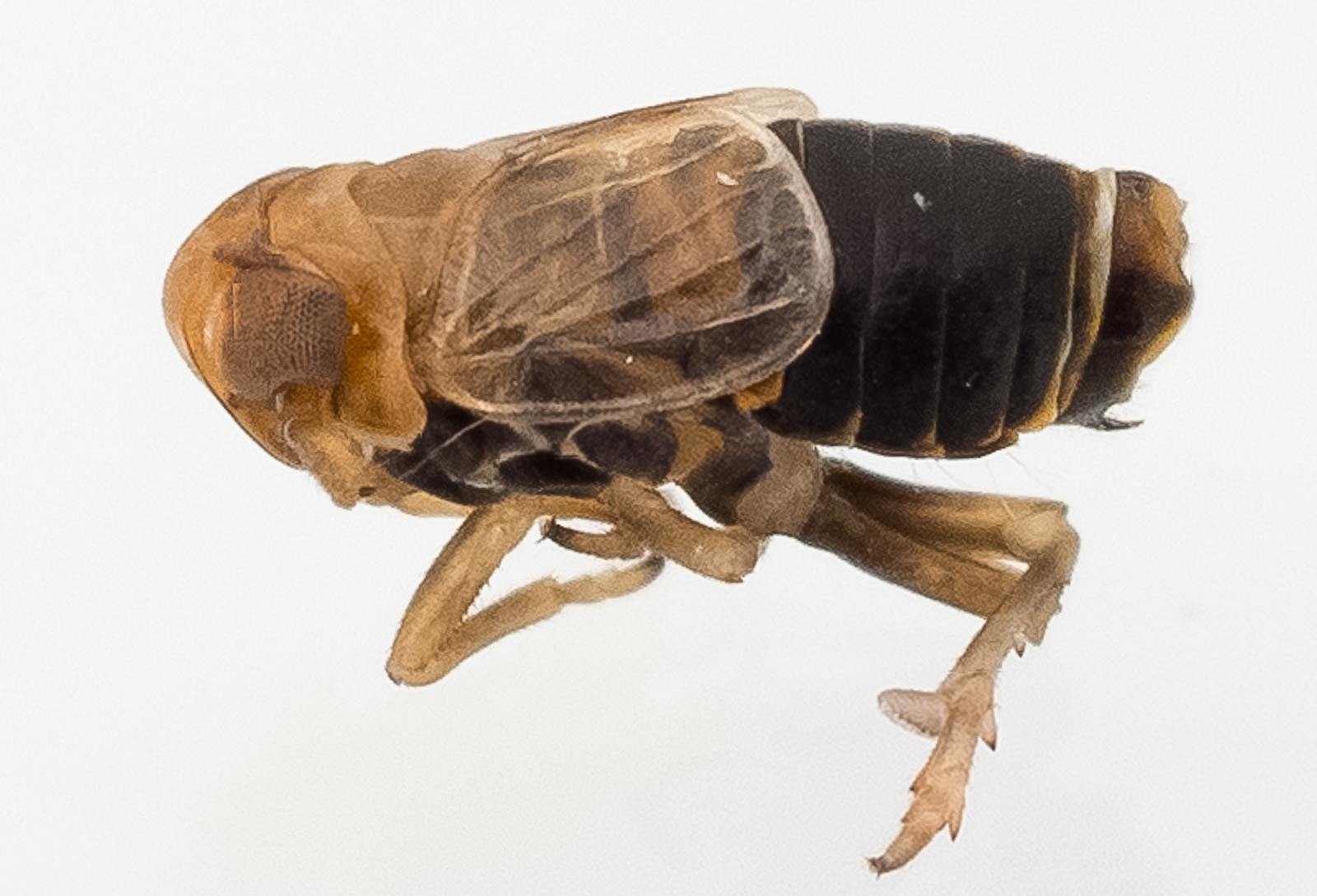
- Kosswigianella spinosa

Scientific classification
- Kingdom: Animalia
- Phylum: Arthropoda
- Class: Insecta
- Order: Hemiptera
- Suborder: Auchenorrhyncha
- Infraorder: Fulgoromorpha
- Family: Delphacidae
- Tribe: Delphacini
- Genus: Kosswigianella; Wagner, 1963

Synonyms
- Acanthodelphax LeQuesne, 1964; Kosswigianell Wagner, 1963 [lapsus]; Koswigianella Wagner, 1963 [lapsus]

= Kosswigianella =

Genus of true bugs

Kosswigianella is a genus of delphacid planthoppers in the family Delphacidae.

== Species ==
The following species are recognised in the genus Kosswigianella:

- Kosswigianella analis (Crawford, 1914)
- Kosswigianella denticauda (Boheman, 1847)
- Kosswigianella emeljanovi (Wilson, 1992)
- Kosswigianella exigua (Boheman, 1847)
- Kosswigianella irrutilo Hamilton, 2002
- Kosswigianella kirgizorum (Anufriev, 2002)
- Kosswigianella lutulenta (Van Duzee, 1897)
- Kosswigianella lutulentoides (Beamer, 1948)
- Kosswigianella perusta (Beamer, 1947)
- Kosswigianella spinosa (Fieber, 1866)
- Kosswigianella transuralica (Anufriev, 1977)
- Kosswigianella wasatchi Hamilton, 2002
