= Kosswigia =

Scientific classification
- Domain: Eukaryota
- Kingdom: Animalia
- Phylum: Arthropoda
- Class: Insecta
- Order: Coleoptera
- Suborder: Adephaga
- Family: Carabidae
- Tribe: Trechini
- Subtribe: Trechina
- Genus: Kosswigia; Jeannel, 1947
- Species: K. insularis

Binomial name
- Kosswigia insularis Jeannel, 1947

Genus of beetles

Kosswigia is a genus in the ground beetle family Carabidae. This genus has a single species, Kosswigia insularis. It is found in Turkey.
