= Gerta von Ubisch =

Gerta von Ubisch (1882-1965) was a German physicist, geneticist, and botanist. She studied barley and found a genetic explanation for heterostyly. In 1933 she lost her position at Heidelberg University because of her Jewish heritage.
