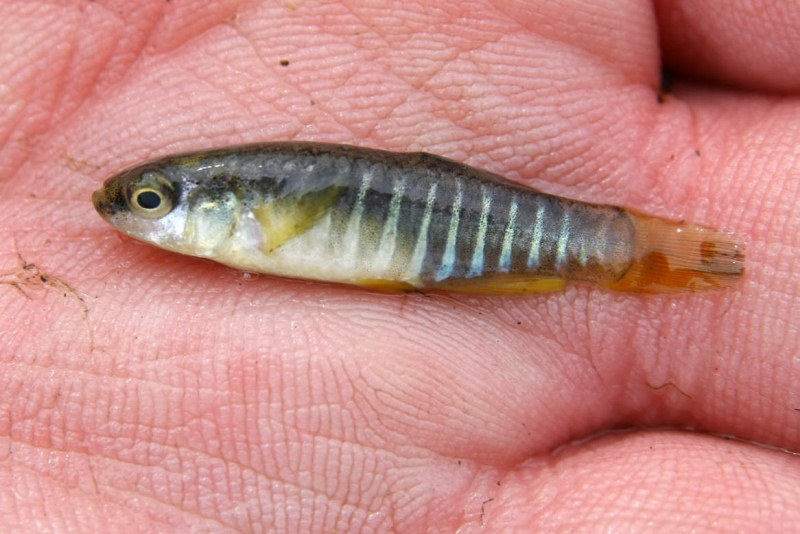
- Aphanius fasciatus
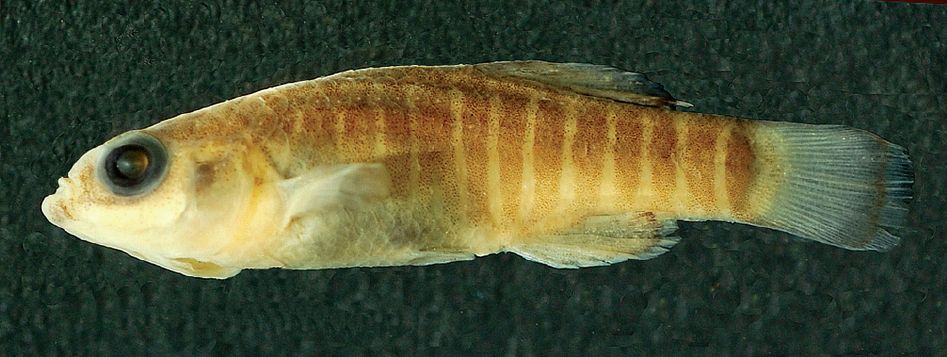
- Esmaeilius mesopotamicus

Scientific classification
- Kingdom: Animalia
- Phylum: Chordata
- Class: Actinopterygii
- Order: Cyprinodontiformes
- Suborder: Cyprinodontoidei
- Family: Aphaniidae; Sethi, 1960

Genera
- See the text

= Aphaniidae =

Oriental killifishes

Family of fishes

Aphaniidae, the Oriental killifishes, are a family of the order Cyprinodontiformes. The 42 extant species of the family inhabit inland waters, rivers and lagoons. The distribution of these species extends from the entire Mediterranean region throughout the neighboring states of the Red Sea and Persian Gulf to southwest India. Several species in this family have very small distributions and are seriously threatened.

== Characteristics ==
Aphaniidae are small fishes that usually grow to a length of 3 to 15 cm (1.2 to 5.9 in). Their bodies are moderately elongated and only slightly flattened at the sides. The mouth is short and their teeth are tricuspid. Scales are complete, but can also be reduced or completely absent. All fins are rounded, dorsal and anal fins similar and are almost symmetrical, the pelvic fins can also be very small. There is usually sexual dimorphism and females are usually larger and have dots or spots on a solid colored background. The males often have horizontal stripes. There can also be significant color dimorphism within a species, due to populations that lived completely isolated from one another.

== Ecology ==
The Aphaniidae species mostly live in small and tiny bodies of water with fresh, brackish or sea water. These can be springs, ponds, swamps, lagoons, canals or ditches. The bodies of water are often directly connected to the sea and have a high content of sulphides or magnesium compounds . Salinity and temperatures can fluctuate greatly, the latter both on an annual basis and between day and night. The fish avoid flowing water and feed on plants as well as various small animals and detritus.

== Taxonomy and systematics ==
Aphanius, the type genus of the Aphaniidae, was introduced in 1827 by the Italian naturalist Giovanni Domenico Nardo. The American ichthyologist Lynne R. Parenti placed the genus together with the South American Andean killifish (Orestias) within the family Cyprinodontidae in the tribe Orestini. Because of the polyphyly of the Cyprinodontidae, the genus was transferred to an independent family, the Aphaniidae, in mid-2017 by the German ichthyologist Jörg Freyhof and two Turkish colleagues. The name was first mentioned in a dissertation in 1960. With the introduction of the genus Paraphanius and the revalidation of Aphaniops in April 2020, the family is no longer monotypic. In mid-2020s, two more genera were newly introduced and three genera were revalidated, so that the Aphaniidae now consists of eight genera :

- Anatolichthys Kosswig & Sözer, 1945
- Aphaniops Hoedeman, 1951
- Aphanius Nardo, 1827
- Apricaphanius Freyhof & Yoğurtçuoğlu, 2020
- Esmaeilius Freyhof & Yoğurtçuoğlu, 2020
- Kosswigichthys Sözer, 1942
- Paraphanius Esmaeili, Teimori, Zarei & Sayyadzadeh, 2020
- Tellia Gervais, 1853
