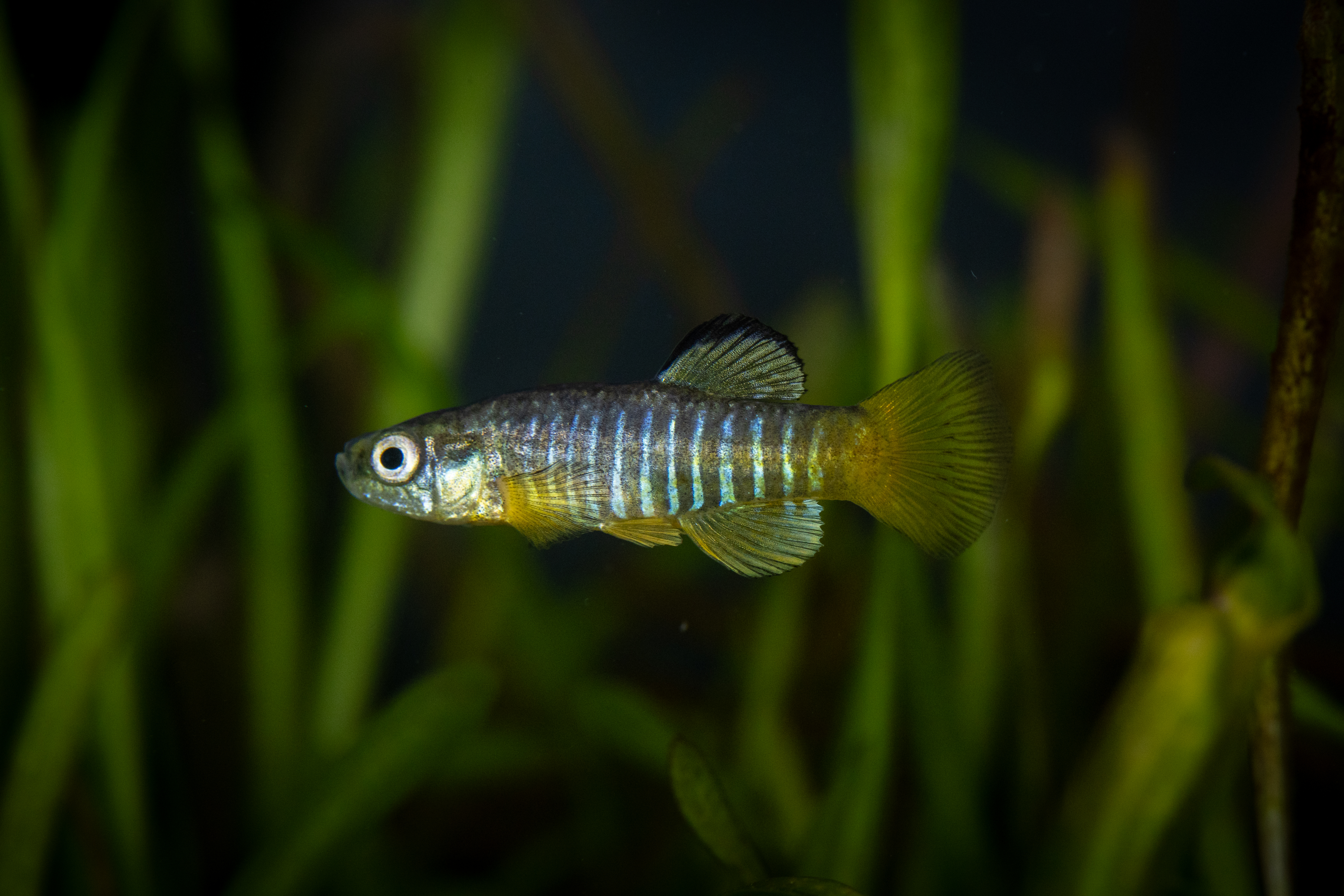
- Male
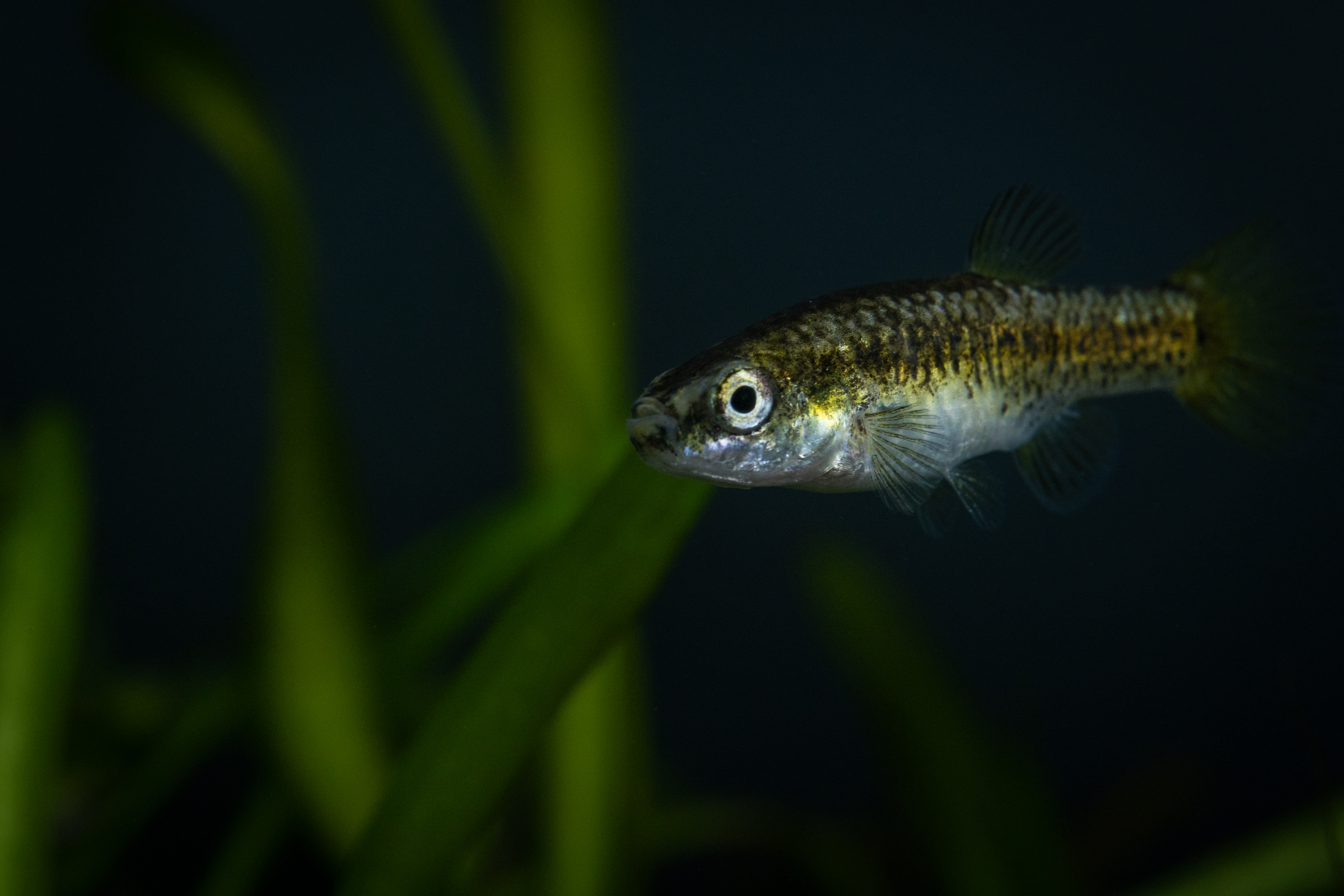
- Female

Conservation status
- Least Concern (IUCN 3.1)

Scientific classification
- Kingdom: Animalia
- Phylum: Chordata
- Class: Actinopterygii
- Division: Teleostei
- Order: Cyprinodontiformes
- Family: Aphaniidae
- Genus: Aphanius
- Species: A. fasciatus

Binomial name
- Aphanius fasciatus (Valenciennes, 1821)

Synonyms
- List: Cyprinodon fasciatus (Valenciennes, 1821); Lebias fasciatus Valenciennes, 1821; Ciprinoides nanofasciatus Nardo, 1824; Aphanius nanus Nardo, 1827; Aphanius fasciatus Nardo, 1827; Lebias lineatopunctata Wagner, 1828; Aphanius lineatopunctatus (Wagner, 1828); Lebias sarda Wagner, 1828; Aphanius sarda (Wagner, 1828); Poecilia calaritana Cuvier, 1829; Aphanius calaritanus (Cuvier, 1829); Cyprinodon calaritanus (Cuvier, 1829); Lebias calaritana (Cuvier, 1829); Lebias calaritanus (Cuvier, 1829); Lebias flava Costa, 1838; Aphanius flavus (Costa, 1838); Lebias nigropunctata Schinz, 1840; Lebias nigropunctata Bonaparte, 1841; Aphanius nigropunctata (Bonaparte, 1841); Cyprinodon moseas Valenciennes, 1846; Aphanius moseasv (Valenciennes, 1846); Cyprinodon hammonis Valenciennes, 1846; Aphanius hammonis (Valenciennes, 1846); Cyprinodon cyanogaster Guichenot, 1859; Aphanius cyanogaster (Guichenot, 1859); Cyprinodon doliatus Guichenot, 1859; Aphanius doliatus (Guichenot, 1859); Micromugil timidus Gulia, 1861; Aphanius timidus (Gulia, 1861); Micromugil macrogaster Gulia, 1861; Cyprinodon desioi Gianferrari, 1933; Aphanius desioi (Gianferrari, 1933)

= Mediterranean killifish =

Species of fish

The Mediterranean killifish, Mediterranean banded killifish or South European toothcarp (Aphanius fasciatus) is a species of fish in the family Aphaniidae. It is found in Albania, Algeria, Bosnia and Herzegovina, Croatia, Cyprus, Egypt, France, Greece, Israel, Italy, Lebanon, Libya, Malta, Morocco, Montenegro, Slovenia, Syria, Tunisia, and Turkey. Its natural habitats are saline lakes, saline marshes, and coastal saline lagoons.

== Description ==
The Mediterranean killifish has an elongated body that is slightly flattened on the sides. Its head which is flattened on the top, has large eyes and an upper mouth that is covered with small, three-pointed teeth. There are 25 to 30 large scales in a longitudinal row on the body, and the head is also scaled. The pectoral fins are located below the middle of the body, the ventral fins are located on the abdomen. The dorsal fin with its ten to thirteen rays is located quite far back, just before the anal fin, which consists of nine to twelve rays. The caudal fin is not forked and ends rounded. All of the Mediterranean killifish's fins have only soft rays . As with many Toothcarps, the coloring varies greatly between the sexes. Males are olive-green-bluish on the back and flanks and light on the belly with a silvery sheen, and they also have ten to fifteen broad, dark transverse bands on the flanks. Their fins are yellowish. The female is much more subtly colored, it is light gray-green with only indistinct, narrow transverse bands. Their fins are light gray and transparent. The body length also varies, males reach a length of about 5.5 centimeters, females can reach up to 6 centimeters. This fish has no lateral line organ .

== Distribution, habitat and biology ==
The distribution area of the Mediterranean killifish extends from the Mediterranean coast from the Ligurian Sea to the Middle East . It is also found in North Africa from Gibraltar to the Bitter Lakes in Egypt. It inhabits salt, fresh and brackish water . It can be found in lagoons and river mouths, but also in small stagnant bodies of water and very salty water. From April to September, the females lay their eggs on the bottom, preferably on aquatic plants and algae. After ten to fifteen days, the young hatch and reach sexual maturity at the end of their first year of life . Its diet consists of both animal and plant food. It eats small crustaceans and plankton, as well insects and their larvae, but also plant parts, algae and detritus .
