= Gulia =

Gulia may refer to:

- Gulia clan, a Jat clan of India
- Dmitry Gulia (1874–1960), Abkhazian Soviet writer and poet
- Gavino Gulia (1835–1889), Maltese botanist
- Gulia, a village in Tărtășești Commune in Romania
- Gulia, a village in the town of Dolhasca in Romania

== See also ==
- Gulia Tutberidze Stadium, a stadium in Zugdidi, Georgia
- Guliya, a village in Bulgaria
- Giulia (disambiguation), an Italian name (including a list of people with the name)
