= Examilia =

Examilia Εξαμίλια
- Community
- Location within Greece
- Coordinates: 37°54′N 22°56′E
- Country: Greece
- Administrative region: Peloponnese
- Regional unit: Corinthia
- Municipality: Corinth
- Municipal unit: Corinth
- Elevation: 83 m (272 ft)

Population (2021)
  - Community: 2,670
- Time zone: UTC+2 (EET)
  - Summer (DST): UTC+3 (EEST)
- Postal code: 201 00
- Area code: 27410
- Vehicle registration: ΚΡ

Examilia (Greek: Εξαμίλια) is a town in the municipality of Corinth, Greece. It is situated about 5 km south of Corinth, and 6 km west of Kechries (ancient Cenchreae). The name likely derives from the adjacent Hexamilion Wall, although it had not been in use for some time before the town was founded.

== History ==
The town was first attested in 1676 by French archaeologist Jacob Spon as an Albanian (Arvanite) village. In present times only few of the inhabitants are still able to speak Arvanitika. According to the inhabitants of the town they are descended from Albanian settlers that arrived in Corinth earlier than the ones of Xylokeriza. Based on Spon and Francis Wheler modern historians assume that the ancestors of Examilians had settled the area at least since the late 17th century. Examilians have been reported to not always be in good terms with the inhabitants of Xylokeriza. According to some scholars the source of these local differences is that Examilians descend from earlier settlers than the ones of Xylokeriza. The refugee colony of Washingtonia established in 1829 at the area.

== Demographics ==
Year	Population
1981	1,679
1991	1,409
2001	1,563
2011	2,905
2021	2,670

== Other ==
The population also has Romani minority. On February 18, 2000, clashes occurred with four police officers and the minorities.

== See also ==
- List of settlements in Corinthia
- Washingtonia (colony)
