= Hellenistic fortifications =

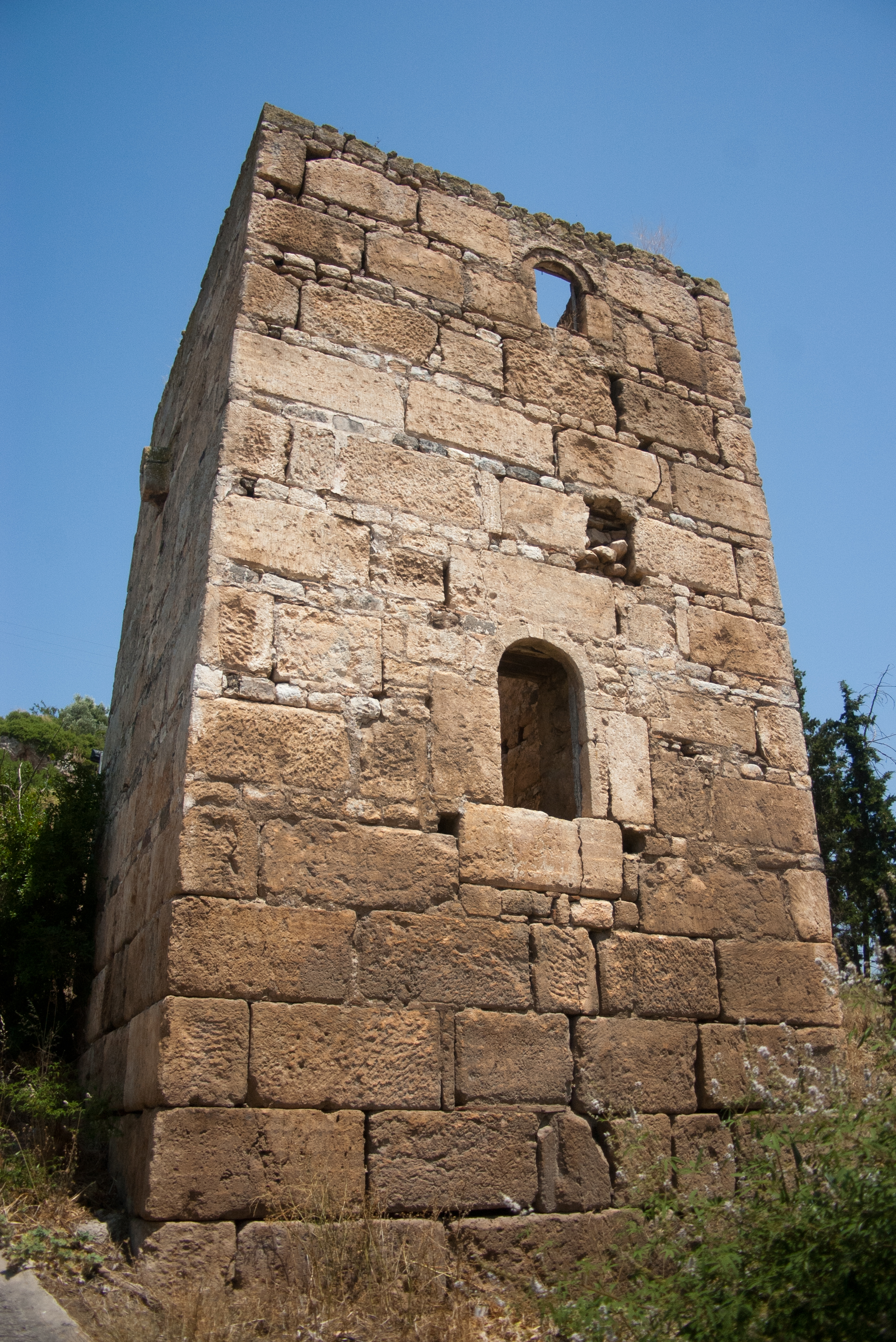
A Hellenistic tower from Achinos, Phthiotis.

Hellenistic fortifications are defense structures constructed during the Hellenistic Period in the eastern Mediterranean and into West Asia (323 - ca. 30 B.C.E.) by the states which succeeded Alexander the Great. These included fortification walls, towers, and gates. The expansion of their territory created the need for new fortifications for new settlements. This, combined with developing military technology, led to changes in style of architecture specific to the Hellenistic Period.

== Historical Chronology ==
The Hellenistic Period begins with the death of Alexander the Great and ends with the rise of the Roman Empire. Alexander's successors, the Diadochi controlled territories from Egypt to India. Over time, being "Greek" became less of a geographic locator, and more a representation of personal cultural ties. Therefore architecture built during this time developed both a mix of standard Greek elements and local styles.

== Fortification walls ==
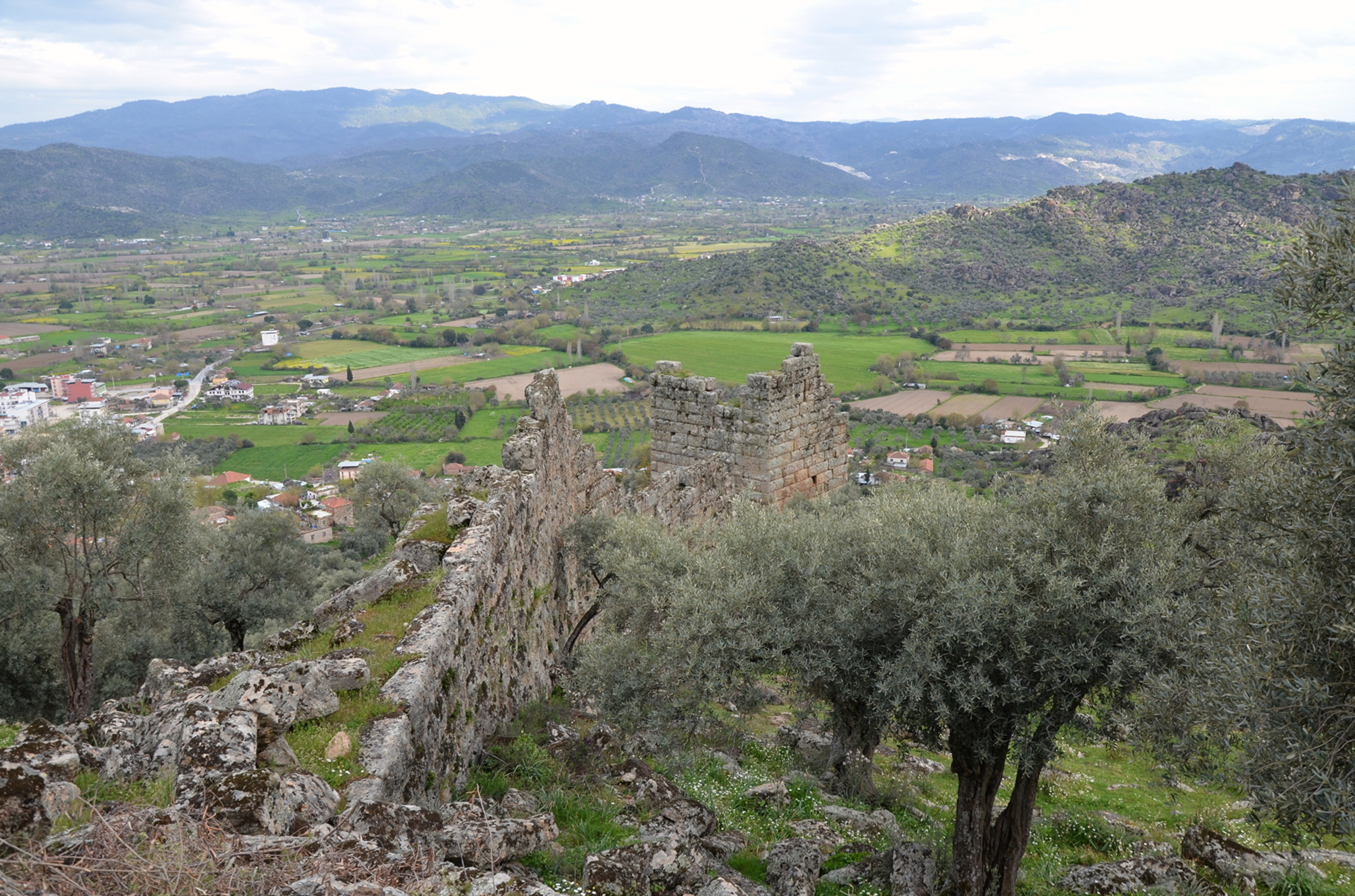
A fortification wall seen at Alinda, Caria.

The buildup of new cities required the build up of fortification walls. Fortification walls served multiple purposes. They served as a means of protection from invasion and as markers of territory. Walls were first constructed around the city's Acropolis, to ensure the safety of the most important part of Greek society—their sacred space. The extent to which the defensive walls protected only the city-center, or spread into the countryside, varied. The intensity of defense measures depended on a city's vulnerability and likelihood of attack.

Therefore, it was common to see Greek establishments at naturally defensible locations such as mountains and rivers. These natural barriers sometimes prevented the need to build fortifications. Choosing geography as a means of defense only increased during the Hellenistic period with the development of colonies. When specifically looking to where to build a new city, rulers chose locations with defense in mind. An example of this can be seen at Mount Oneion, Corinthia. Located on the Corinthian isthmus, the Mount Oreion mountain range provided a natural barrier for the city. In low sloping planes, such as the sites of Stanotopi and Maritsa, walls were constructed to add to protection.

== Towers ==
Towers provided a variety of purposes for the Greeks. They were a place to store military supplies and provide lookouts out over the fortification walls. In the Hellenistic Period, there was a shift in the construction and placement of towers. This is due to the increasing necessity to have what would be the strongest defensive line. Prior to the Hellenistic Period, towers were largely simple, single-storied square buildings. Due to advances in military technology this style of tower changed.

At the start of the Hellenistic Period, towers were incorporated into the fortification walls. Later, there was a shift to towers being constructed separate from the wall system. Circular or multi-angled towers would have been more difficult to incorporate into the flat-walled architecture. They were also separated due to their vulnerability to attack.

This idea is seen specifically at Alinda, Caria. Original construction had the citadel connected in the city walls. A later construction purposefully brought the citadel outside the city defense fortifications, and away from the city center. This has been hypothesized as a decision to further protect the city, by keeping a potential military target away from the city.

== Materials and construction ==
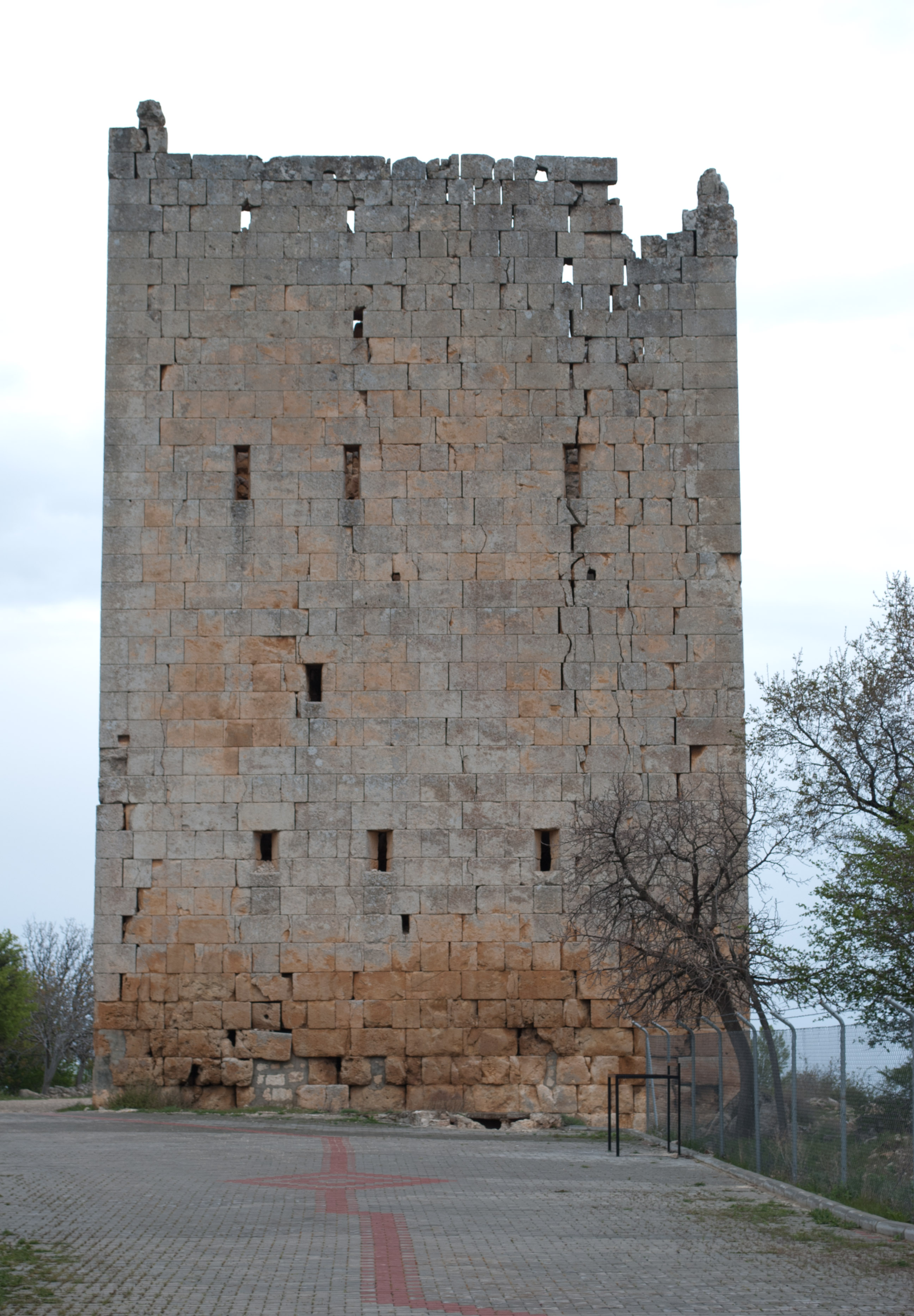
A Hellenistic tower at Olba, Cilicia showing the use of ashlar blocks.

Hellenistic fortifications were built out of a variety of materials. The materials largely depended on what could be sourced locally. This provided the cheapest, most abundant option. Most common were ashlar block masonry and mud-brick. However, we also see limestone and stone filled with rubble. Mudbrick was common in colonies located around the Black Sea and Ionia.

In the Hellenistic period, the use of ashlar block style masonry developed. Here, blocks were evenly cut small and rectangular, to create the strongest individual block, creating stronger walls and towers. These construction projects were largely financed from public funds, rather than from individual donors as they were a public necessity.

== Architecture ==
Colonies created during the Hellenistic period had a mix of Greek and indigenous styles of architecture. A majority of settlements around the Black Sea were founded by Milesians, therefore architectural methods and styles of the Milesians were used. But, in these same colonies, there was a sense of needing to legitimize their "Greekness". New rulers wanted to prove that they were just as Greek as cities in mainland Greece. Therefore, many elements found in traditional Greek fortification walls were also seen in colonies far from the mainland.

At the site of Chersonesus, blocks were cut long and flat. Masons intentionally used a style of untrimming to give a stylistic effect common in Greek cities. In all fortification walls, one continuous idea was all walls were kept relatively low, but powerful from the use of small bricks or ashlar blocks. It was not economically effective to create extra-tall or extra-thick walls, when the strength in the stone would provide sufficient defenses. Walls were only made as tall or as thick as they were needed. Generally, fortifications were simple in design, as their purpose was to defend, not to necessarily look pretty. However, Chersonesos offers a unique example of Greeks emphasizing aesthetics over what was most economical or defensible.

== See also ==
- Hellenistic armies
