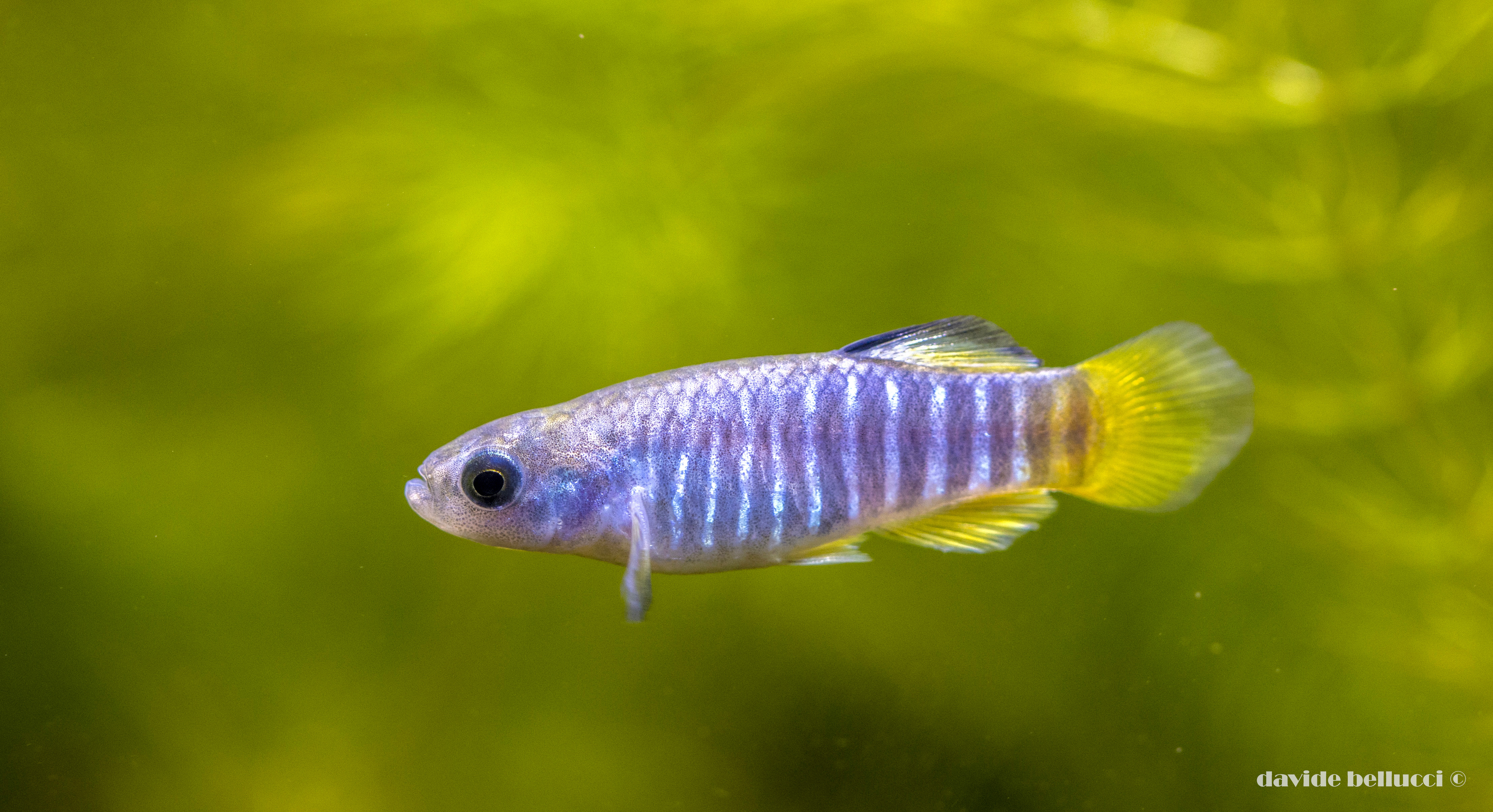
- Male
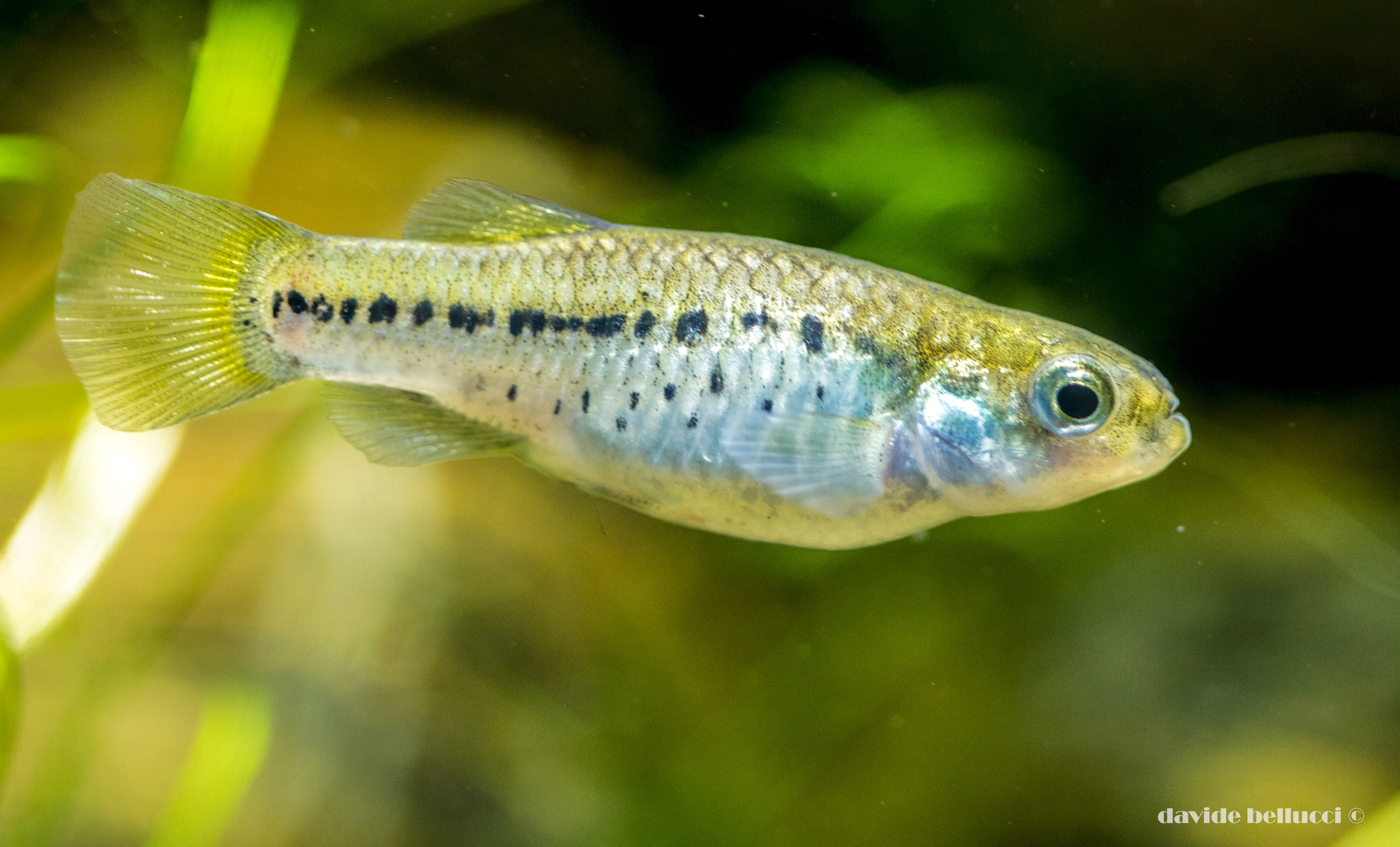
- Adult female

Conservation status
- Least Concern (IUCN 3.1)

Scientific classification
- Kingdom: Animalia
- Phylum: Chordata
- Class: Actinopterygii
- Order: Cyprinodontiformes
- Family: Aphaniidae
- Genus: Aphanius
- Species: A. almiriensis

Binomial name
- Aphanius almiriensis Kottelat, Barbieri & Stoumboudi, 2007

= Almiri toothcarp =

Species of fish

The Almiri toothcarp or Almiri killifish (Aphanius almiriensis) is a species of killifish belonging to the family Aphaniidae. Its habitat is brackish springs and marshes in the northern Mediterranean basin.

== Taxonomy ==
The Almiri toothcarp was first formally described in 2007 by Maurice Kottelat, Roberta Barbieri and Maria Th. Stoumboudi with its type locality given as a brackish water spring Kokosi at the southern end of Almiri beach, at Kato Almiri, about 4 km (2.5 mi) south of Loutra Elenis in Korinthia District in the Peloponnese in Greece at 37°50'32"N, 23°00'58"E. This species is one of two extant species in the genus Aphanius which are classified within the family Aphaniidae, the Oriental toothcarps.

== Etymology ==
The species name, almiriensis, refers to Almiri, in the Peloponnese region of Greece where the fish was originally discovered.

== Description ==
The Almiri toothcarp is identified by the yellow caudal fin in males which has a broad and indistinct grey margin while the females have between 7 and 11 roundish dark blotches on their sides, connected by a midlateral stripe the male also has between 6 and 10 bars set at regular intervals on the body. This is a small fish with a maximum standard length of 2.9 cm (1.1 in) in males and 3.9 cm (1.5 in) in females.

== Conservation status ==
Due to one of its home springs being dammed up with rocks in the late 1990s to early 2000s, and it being possibly extinct at its type locality, the IUCN considered the fish to be Critically Endangered on criteria B1ab (i, ii, iii, i, v) and B2ab (i, ii, iii, iv, v); However, as it is now known to be much wider spread across the Mediterranean region, including the Aegean coast of Thrace, the Dodecanese Islands, Turkey and the heel of Italy, this has been revised to Least Concern.
