= Kechries =

Village in Corinthia, Greece

Kechries Κεχριές
- Settlement
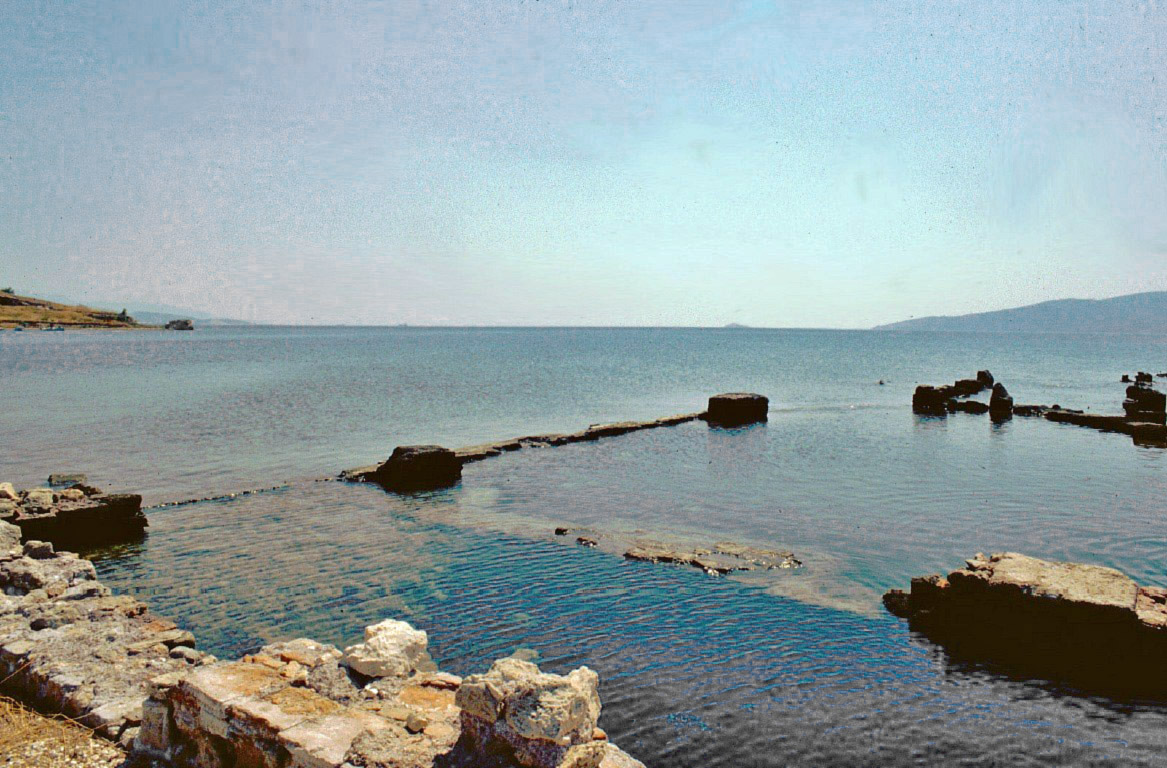
- Kenchreai. Isis Temple, converted into basilica after the earthquake 365

- Location within Greece
- Coordinates: 37°53′6″N 22°59′15″E
- Country: Greece
- Administrative region: Peloponnese
- Regional unit: Corinthia
- Municipality: Corinth
- Municipal unit: Corinth
- Community: Xylokeriza

Population (2021)
  - Total: 319
- Time zone: UTC+2 (EET)
  - Summer (DST): UTC+3 (EEST)

Kechries (Greek: Κεχριές, rarely Κεχρεές) is a village in the municipality of Corinth in Corinthia in Greece, part of the community of Xylokeriza. Population 319 (2021). It takes its name from the ancient port town Kenchreai or Cenchreae (Ancient Greek: Κεγχρεαί), which was situated at the same location.

== Geography ==
Kechries is situated near a broad bay at the western end of the Saronic Gulf, called Kechries Bay. This coastline forms the easternmost point of the Corinth Fault. The area has frequently felt the impact of seismic activity, which has led to the moderate subsidence of the coastline since ancient times. Kechries is a small village with a school and a church. The number of permanent residents of Kechries is small, and many houses there are used seasonally by owners who reside elsewhere. The Oneia Mountains lie to the south, where a major stone quarry is located, and the village is surrounded by fertile land dedicated to the cultivation of olive, the vine, and fruit trees.

Kechries is located about 8 kilometres (5.0 mi) southeast of modern Corinth and 4 kilometres (2.5 mi) southwest of Isthmia, at the eastern end of the Corinth Canal. Other nearby villages are Loutra Elenis (2 km south), Xylokeriza (4 km west) and Kyras Vrysi (3 km north).

== History ==
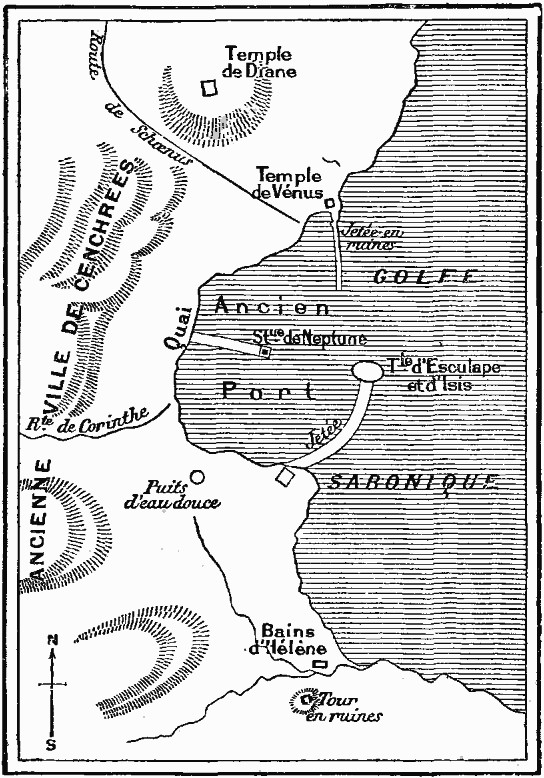
Map (1910)

In ancient times, Kenchreai was one of the two ports of the inland city-state of Corinth. While Kenchreai served the eastern trade routes via the Saronic Gulf, Lechaion on the Corinthian Gulf served the trade routes leading west to Italy and the rest of Europe. Situated on the eastern side of the Isthmus of Corinth, Kenchreai sat at a natural crossroads for ships arriving from the east and overland traffic heading north and south between central Greece and the Peloponnese.

=== Beginnings ===
The origin of Kenchreai is unknown, but it must have been inhabited from early times, probably in prehistory, on account of the deep natural harbor that was favorable for landing ships. The area is endowed with abundant water sources, a massive bedrock of oolitic limestone that is excellent building stone, and several defensible positions with good viewpoints. The name of the site seems to derive from the ancient Greek word for millet, and the area's capacity for agricultural production is still evident.

=== Late Archaic, Classical and Hellenistic periods ===
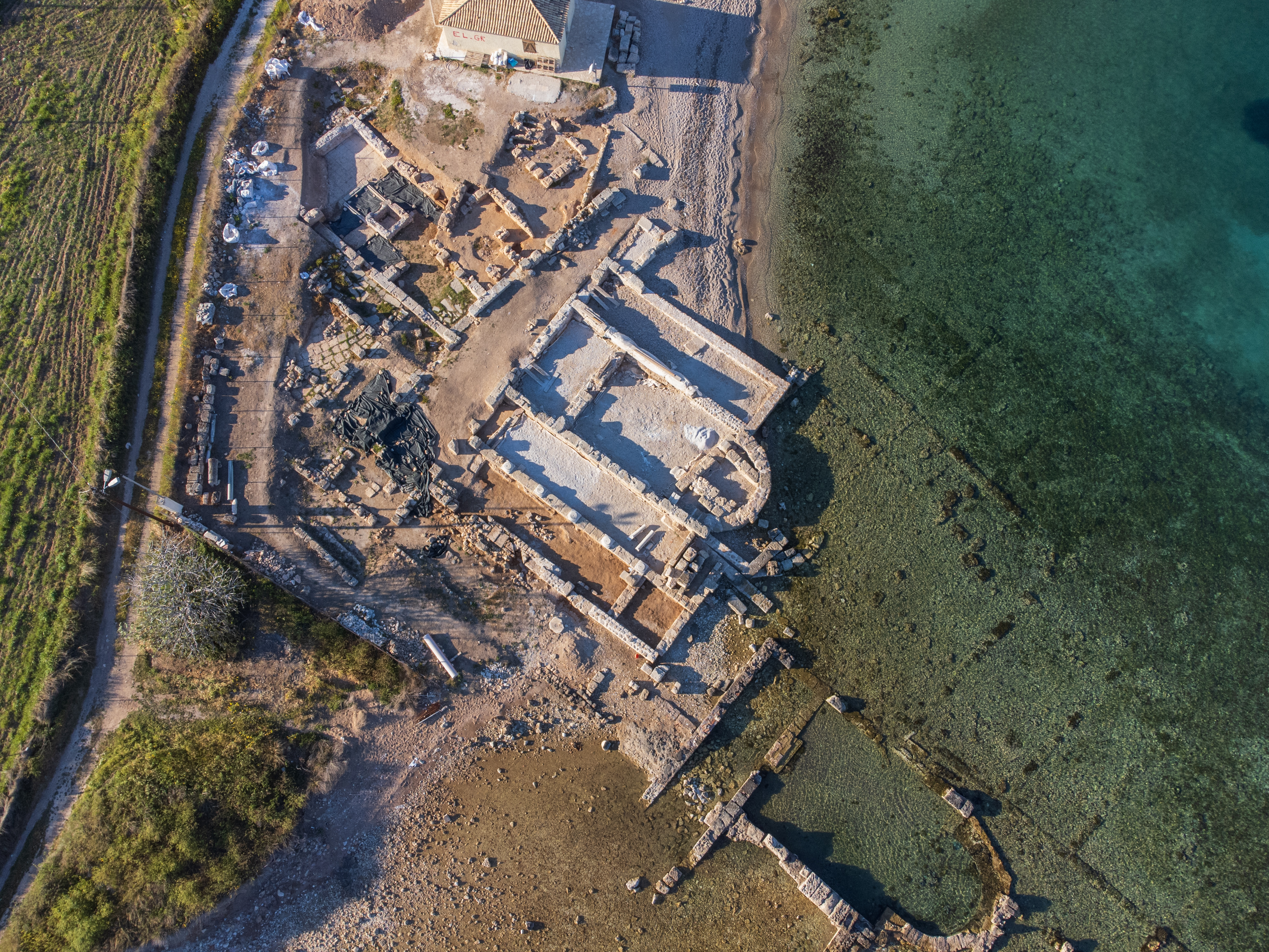
Temple of Isis and later Roman basilica

The earliest textual sources for Kenchreai, an epitaph of the Late Archaic period (late 6th-early 5th century BC) and references in historical and geographical writings of the Classical to Hellenistic eras (5th-2nd centuries BC), reveal that there was a permanent settlement and a fortified naval station. Few archaeological remains survive from this early settlement, but it seems to have been located westward from the modern coast, along the prominent ridge that borders the modern village to the north.

=== Roman period ===
Kenchreai flourished during the Roman Empire, when the settlement was focused around the crescent-shaped harbour enclosed by massive concrete breakwaters and protected by sea-walls. The local community was small but prosperous, and it was distinguished by its social, cultural, and religious diversity. Ancient literature and inscriptions from the site attest to the presence of cults of Aphrodite, Isis, Asklepios, Poseidon, Dionysos, and Pan.

The many buildings and objects found, including several of exceptional artistic quality, show the considerable wealth of local residents at this time.

==== Early Christian presence ====
Christianity also arrived at Kenchreai early in the religion's history. According to Acts 18:18, the Apostle Paul stopped at Kenchreai during his second missionary journey, where he had his hair cut to fulfil a vow, probably a Nazirite vow. Paul mentions the place and a woman named Phoebe in the local assembly in his epistle to the Romans (Romans 16:1).

=== Byzantine period ===
Archaeological evidence indicates that trade with other Mediterranean regions continued into the 7th Century.

A later ecclesiastical tradition recorded the existence of a bishop at Kenchreai, but the veracity of these accounts is hard to establish.

=== Medieval period ===
Historical and geographical texts of the Byzantine and post-Byzantine eras indicate that Kenchreai was still used by travellers and Imperial expeditions. While the ancient harbour could still receive ship traffic after antiquity, the archaeological evidence for medieval occupation is thin, and any permanent settlement must have been smaller than in ancient times.

=== Modern period ===
A small harbor facility operated during early modern times, mostly serving to export local produce, including grains, citrus fruit, and tomatoes.

== Archaeological work ==
The ancient harbor was partly excavated in 1962-1969 by a team sponsored by the Athens-based American School of Classical Studies under the general direction of Robert Scranton. Excavations have uncovered several buildings that attest to the commercial vitality of the port throughout the Roman Empire and into the 7th century, when maritime activity and local habitation apparently diminished. The most impressive buildings located at the north and south ends of the harbor include blocks of rooms near the waterfront (probably warehouses); fishtanks; monumental complexes decorated with sculpted marble (possibly sanctuaries of Aphrodite and of Isis whose cults the 2nd-century writer Pausanias attests at the town), mosaic pavements, and wall-painting (either sacred structures, lavish seaside villas, or rich public benefactions); and a Christian basilica. Most distinctive among the many discoveries was over a hundred fourth-century panels in glass opus sectile found in their original packing crates and awaiting installation in a possible sanctuary of Isis whose great annual festival is the scene of the climax of Apuleius' novel "Metamorphosis" which tells the story of a man turned into a donkey and back again (thanks to the intervention of the goddess). The Chicago team published six volumes about the architecture, glass panels, pottery, coins, lamps and furniture pieces from the excavations. Material from the excavations is stored in the Archaeological Museum of Isthmia, where some of it is on display. The American Excavations at Kenchreai are now directed by Joseph L. Rife, whose team has begun to re-evaluate the discoveries in the 1960s and to complete their study and publication.

Since 2002, survey and excavation jointly sponsored by the American School of Classical Studies and the Greek Ministry of Culture has explored the area immediately north of the harbour on the low coastal ridge called Koutsongila. These investigations concentrated on a vast cemetery of Early Roman chamber tombs and Roman to Early Byzantine cist graves, an opulent residential quarter facing seaward, and other large structures overlooking the harbour. The bountiful artifacts and structures found both at the harbour and on Koutsongila reveal the considerable wealth of local residents, including several objects of exceptional artistic quality, and a connection to points of production and exchange to the east in the Aegean islands, Asia Minor, and the Near East.

== Demographics ==
Year	Population
1991	333
2001	237
2011	238
2021	319

== See also ==
- List of settlements in Corinthia
