= Washingtonia (colony) =

Washingtonia, originally named Columbia, was a short-lived refugee colony established in 1829 at Examilia site on the Isthmus of Corinth in Greece. It was founded by Samuel Gridley Howe, working in cooperation with Greek Governor Ioannis Kapodistrias, to provide homes and farmland for families displaced by the Greek War of Independence.

== Background ==
After the outbreak of the Greek War of Independence in 1821, large numbers of civilians were displaced from their homes. When Ioannis Kapodistrias became Governor of Greece in 1827, one of his early priorities was to find housing and farmland for these refugees. He consulted with several individuals, including the American Samuel Gridley Howe. In February 1829 the French geographer Pierre Peytier suggested Examilia, a village on the Isthmus of Corinth that had been largely destroyed during the conflict, as a potential site for resettlement.

Howe later recalled in his journal that during a March 1829 visit to the area he decided to request 5,000 stremmata of land from the government in order to establish a colony for poor families. In his account, he sometimes presented himself as the sole initiator of the project. He was joined by Dr. Russ and the Scottish George Finlay, and took up residence in the abandoned house of Kiamil Bey, the Ottoman ruler of Corinthia who had been executed during the war.

Howe arranged for the men of the families to arrive first and build huts before their families joined them. In addition to the settlers, displaced people from the surrounding region were hired as laborers for construction work.

== Foundation ==
In March 1829, Kapodistrias formally granted Howe 5,000 stremmata (and eventually 10,000 stremmata) of land near Examilia. The property was divided into family plots, with tools and animals provided, and rations of corn meal distributed to anyone over ten years old. In return, families were expected to cultivate the land and give Howe half of their harvest. To clear the ruins of Upper Examilia, about one hundred local laborers were employed.

The settlement was initially named Columbia.

== The settlement ==
By April 1829, the Greek government instructed local peasants to prepare the land. Families soon arrived from Greece and the Ottoman Empire, and Howe sought to employ as many locals as possible.

By May, the colony had grown to twenty-four families along with many day laborers. Fifteen houses had been built, a school was operating, and a blacksmith with his son had been engaged to provide tools. The settlers harvested wheat, barley, and rye, and Kapodistrias arranged for revenues from the crops to be returned to the community.

In June, more families were living in the colony. Howe proposed renaming the settlement Washingtonia.

In July, the colonists constructed a cattle barn and the school expanded to serve children from nearby villages. Howe’s attempts to Americanize the inhabitants were especially apparent. On July 4, he organized a celebration for the United States Independence Day featuring a feast, dancing, cannon fire, and the laying of a hospital’s foundation. A week later, however, he withheld wages from colonists who observed the Feast of Saint John and noted in his journal his disapproval of Orthodox feast days.

By August 1829, even more families were established and the colony had become largely self-sufficient, and food rations were discontinued.

In September 1829, Howe contracted malaria and left for several months. On returning later that year he found the colony weakened and blamed Kapodistrias for not granting his full requests for support and exemptions.

By 1834, tax records indicated that only a handful of buildings remained, while most had been destroyed during political unrest. Many settlers had moved to cities such as Athens and Thebes.

By the 1840s, the name Washingtonia had fallen out of use, the area was again known as Examilia, and European travelers referred to it as the "American colony".

Although short-lived, the project left an impression on locals. When Howe passed through Examilia in 1844, villagers recognized him and welcomed him with a feast.

== Rediscovery ==
Since 2016, a team of archaeologists from several U.S. universities has been worked to locate the remains of Washingtonia. A breakthrough came in 2023, when researchers identified a reference to the "Maison Ang." ("English House") on an 1829–1830 French map by Pierre Peytier. Combined with Howe’s description of a house overlooking both the Corinthian Gulf and Saronic Gulf, the map helped confirm the location of the residence of Howe and George Finlay. Excavations revealed collapsed walls, tiles, glass, and pottery dating to the 19th–20th centuries.

The project also studied agricultural trends in the region, showing shifts from grain and cash crops in the colony’s era to grain during the 1940s wartime shortages, and to olives, citrus, and vineyards in the present day. In 2025, students documented the rediscovery in the film Finding Washingtonia.
