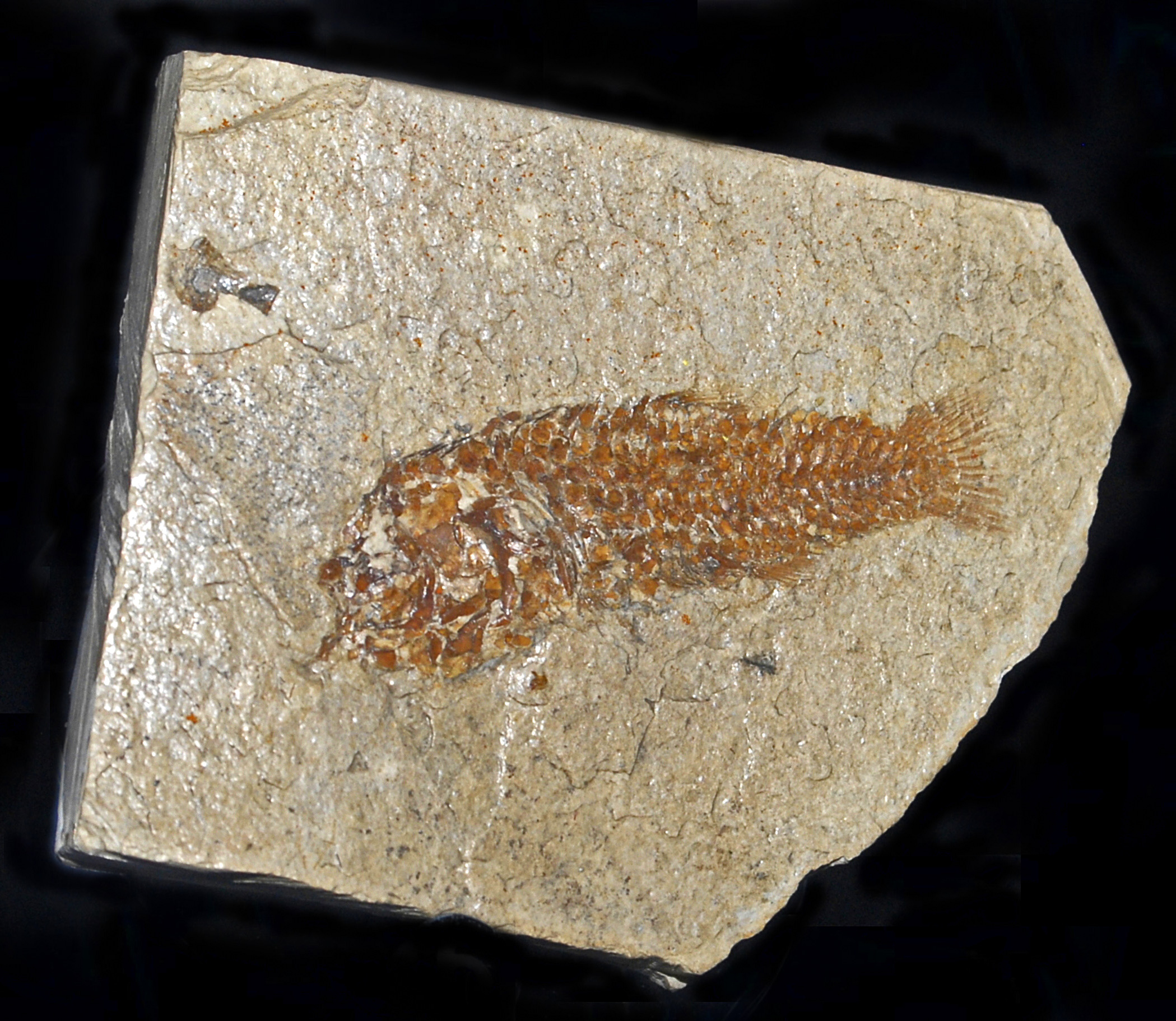
- Fossil of Aphanius crassicaudus

Scientific classification
- Domain: Eukaryota
- Kingdom: Animalia
- Phylum: Chordata
- Class: Actinopterygii
- Order: Cyprinodontiformes
- Family: Aphaniidae
- Genus: Aphanius
- Species: †A. crassicaudus

Binomial name
- †Aphanius crassicaudus Agassiz, 1839

= Aphanius crassicaudus =

Aphanius crassicaudus Temporal range: Late Miocene

Extinct species of fish

Aphanius crassicaudus is an extinct species of fish in the family Aphaniidae. It lived in the Late Miocene in brackish and hypersaline lagoons along the northern coast of the Mediterranean Sea. Fossils are known from Greece, Italy, and Spain.
