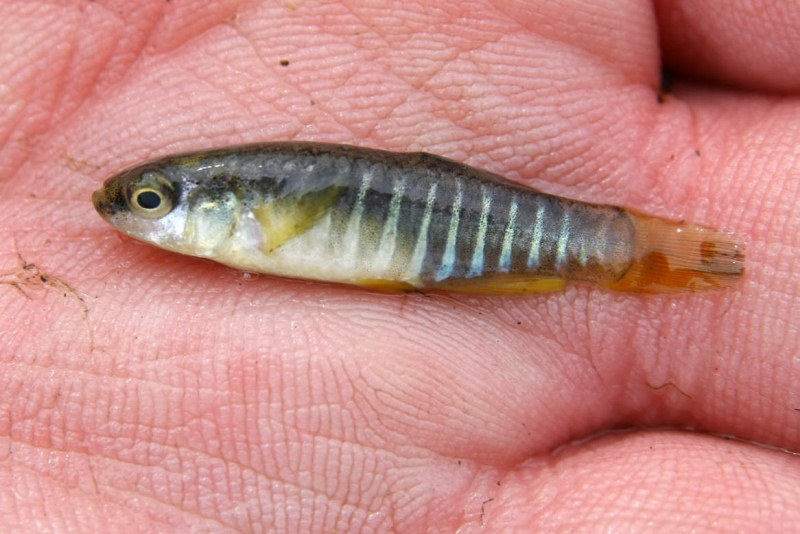
- Aphanius fasciatus

Scientific classification
- Domain: Eukaryota
- Kingdom: Animalia
- Phylum: Chordata
- Class: Actinopterygii
- Order: Cyprinodontiformes
- Family: Aphaniidae
- Genus: Aphanius; Nardo, 1827

Type species
- Aphanius nanus Nardo, 1827

Synonyms
- Lebias Goldfuss, 1820 (invalid name); Micromugil Gulia, 1861

= Aphanius =

Aphanius Temporal range: Miocene–recent

Genus of fishes

Aphanius, commonly referred to as Mediterranean killifish, is a genus of the order Cyprinodontiformes in the family Aphaniidae. They are found in fresh and brackish waters in the coastal plains of the Mediterranean region.

== Taxonomy and systematics ==
There were formerly 39 recognized species in this genus. However, the family Aphaniidae was split in 2020, and species were reallocated to eight monophyletic genera. Several species were reallocated; to five resurrected genera (Anatolichthys, Aphaniops, Kosswigichthys, Paraphanius, and Tellia) and two new genera Esmaeilius and Apricaphanius.

=== Species ===
Following the split, there are two valid species:

- Aphanius almiriensis Kottelat, Barbieri & Stoumboudi, 2007
- Aphanius fasciatus Valenciennes, 1821 (Mediterranean banded killifish)

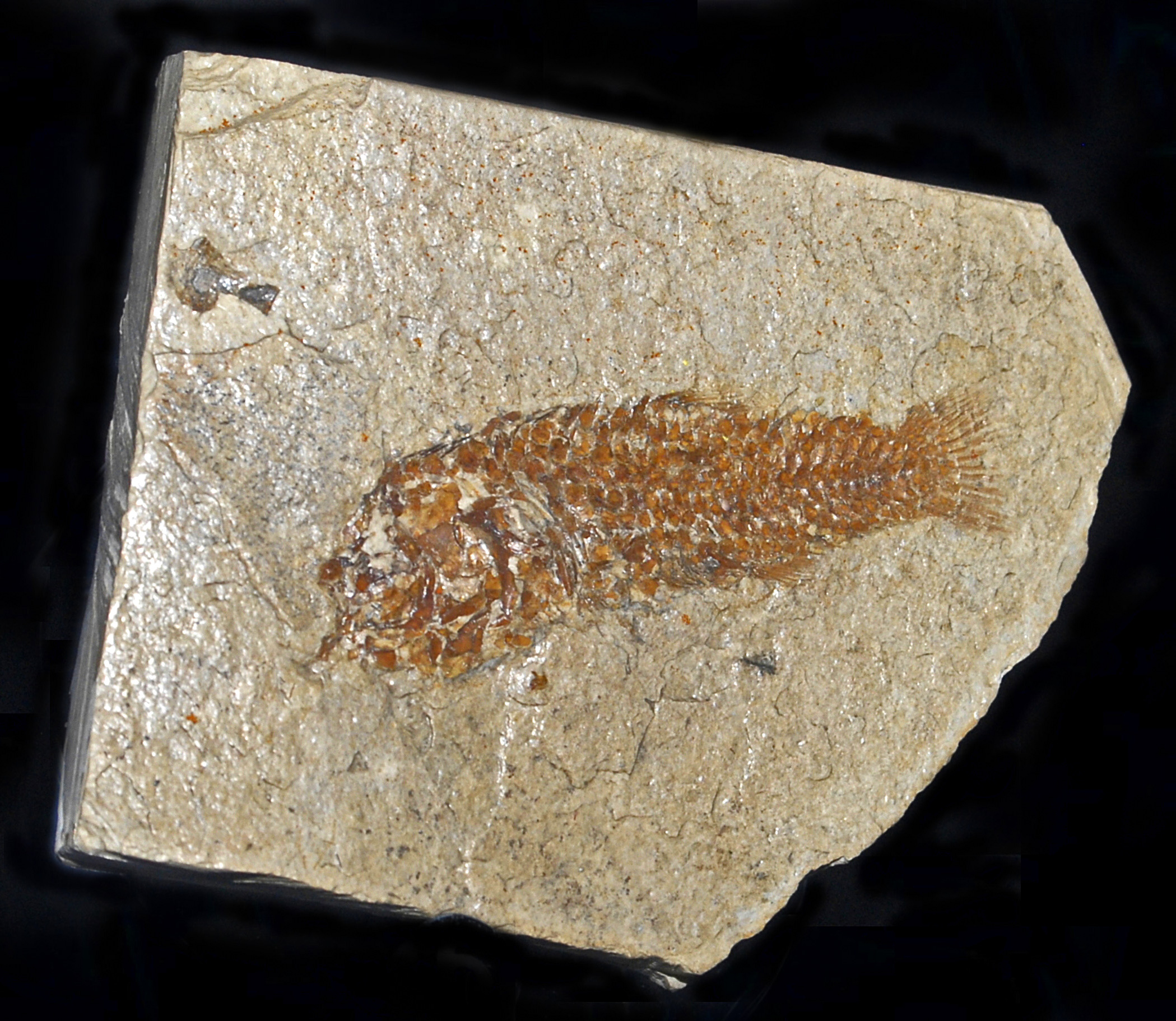
Fossil of Aphanius crassicaudus

Fossil species

- †Aphanius crassicaudus Agassiz 1839
- †Aphanius yerevanicus Vasilyan et al. 2009
- †Lebias cephalotes Agassiz 1839
- †Lebias gaudryi Sauvage 1873
- †Lebias gobio Agassiz 1839
- †Lebias meyeri Agassiz 1839
- †Lebias perpusillus Agassiz 1839

== Fossil record ==
Fossils of extinct species, including A. crassicaudatus and A. yerevanicus, are known as far back as the Early Miocene of the Mediterranean and Caucasus regions. are Fossils of Aphanius are found in strata of the Pleistocene of Italy (age range: from 11.608 to 5.332 million years ago.).
