= Corinth (modern city) =

City in the Peloponnese, Greece

Corinth Κόρινθος
- Municipal unit
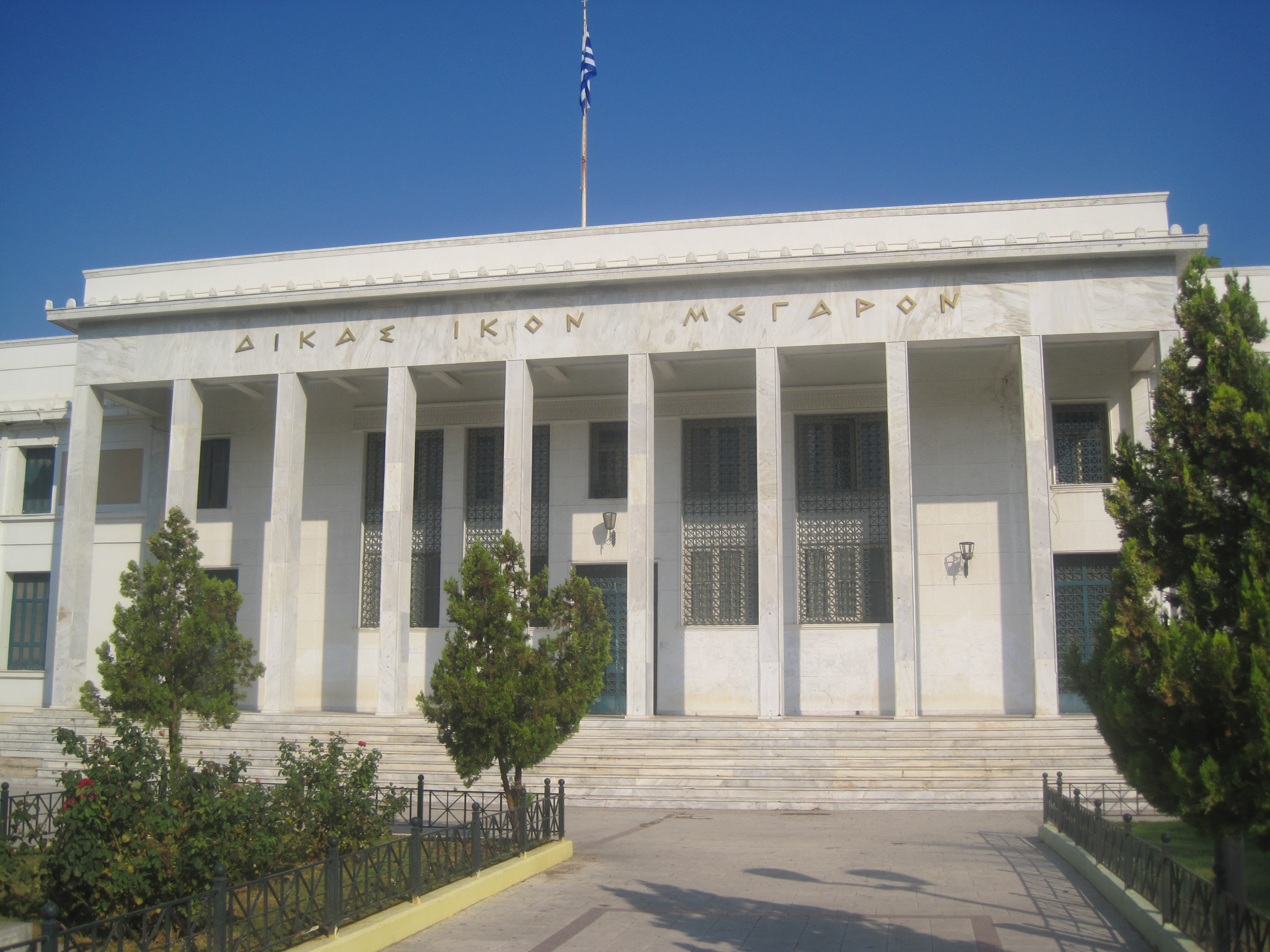
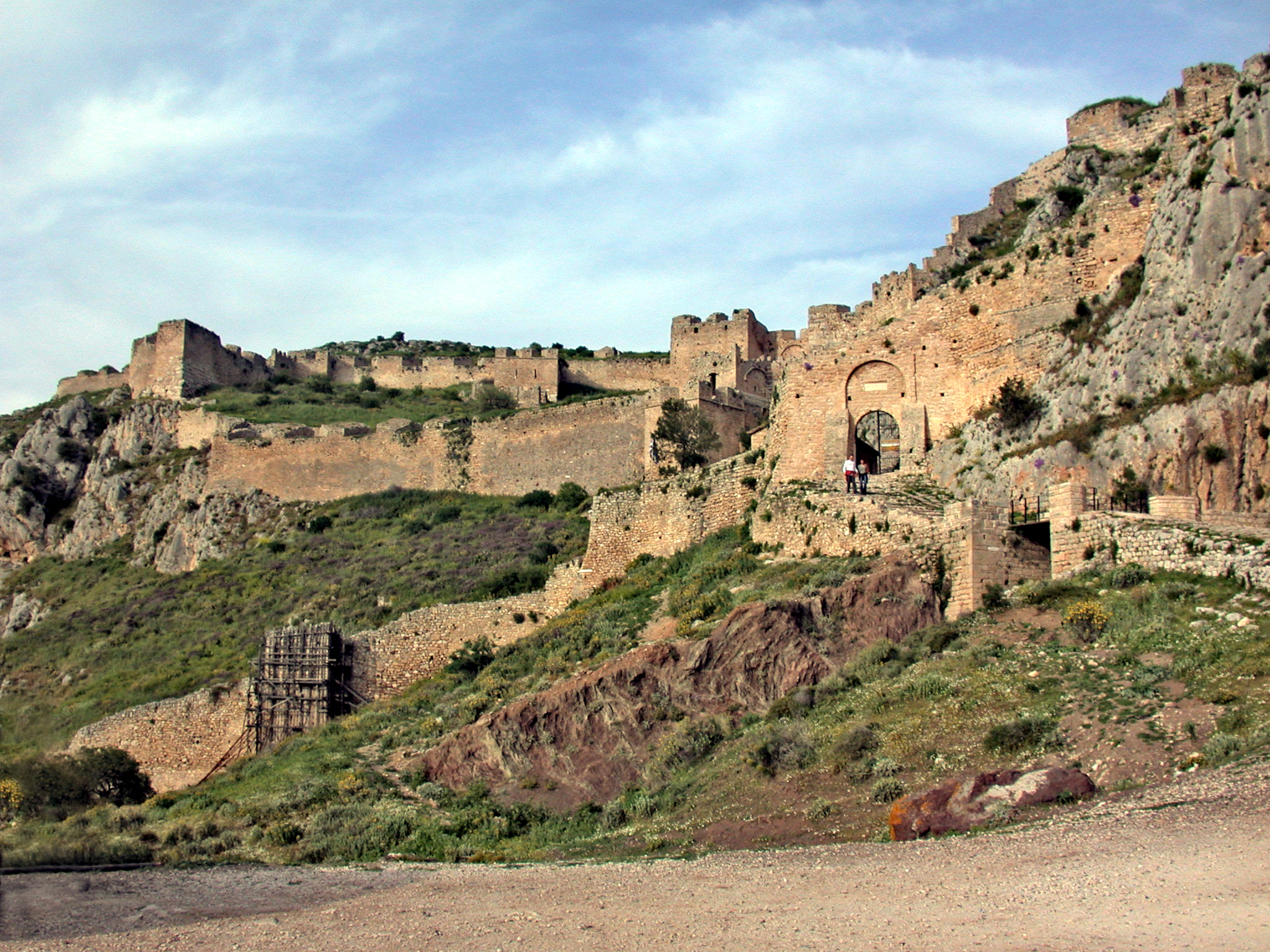
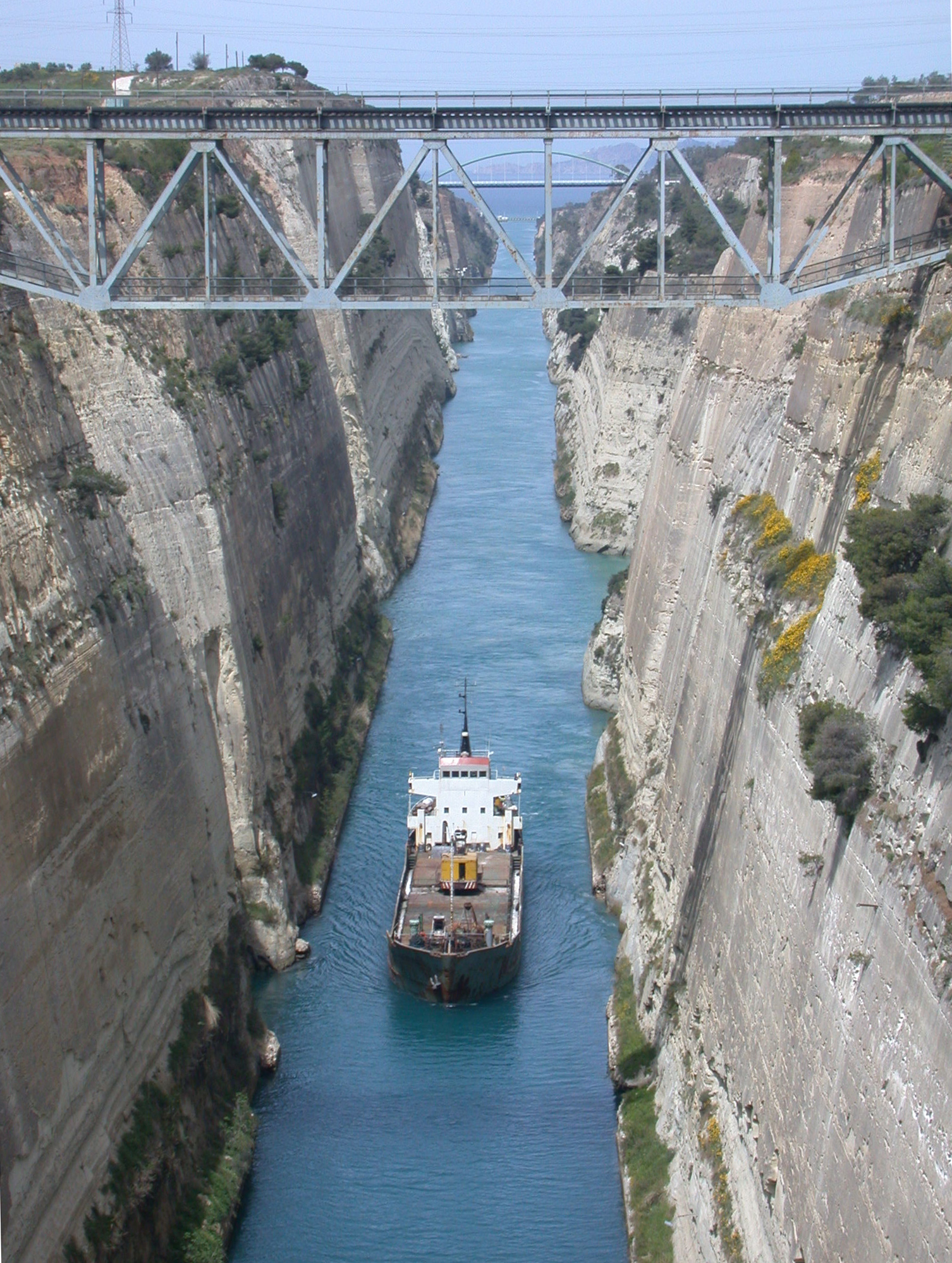
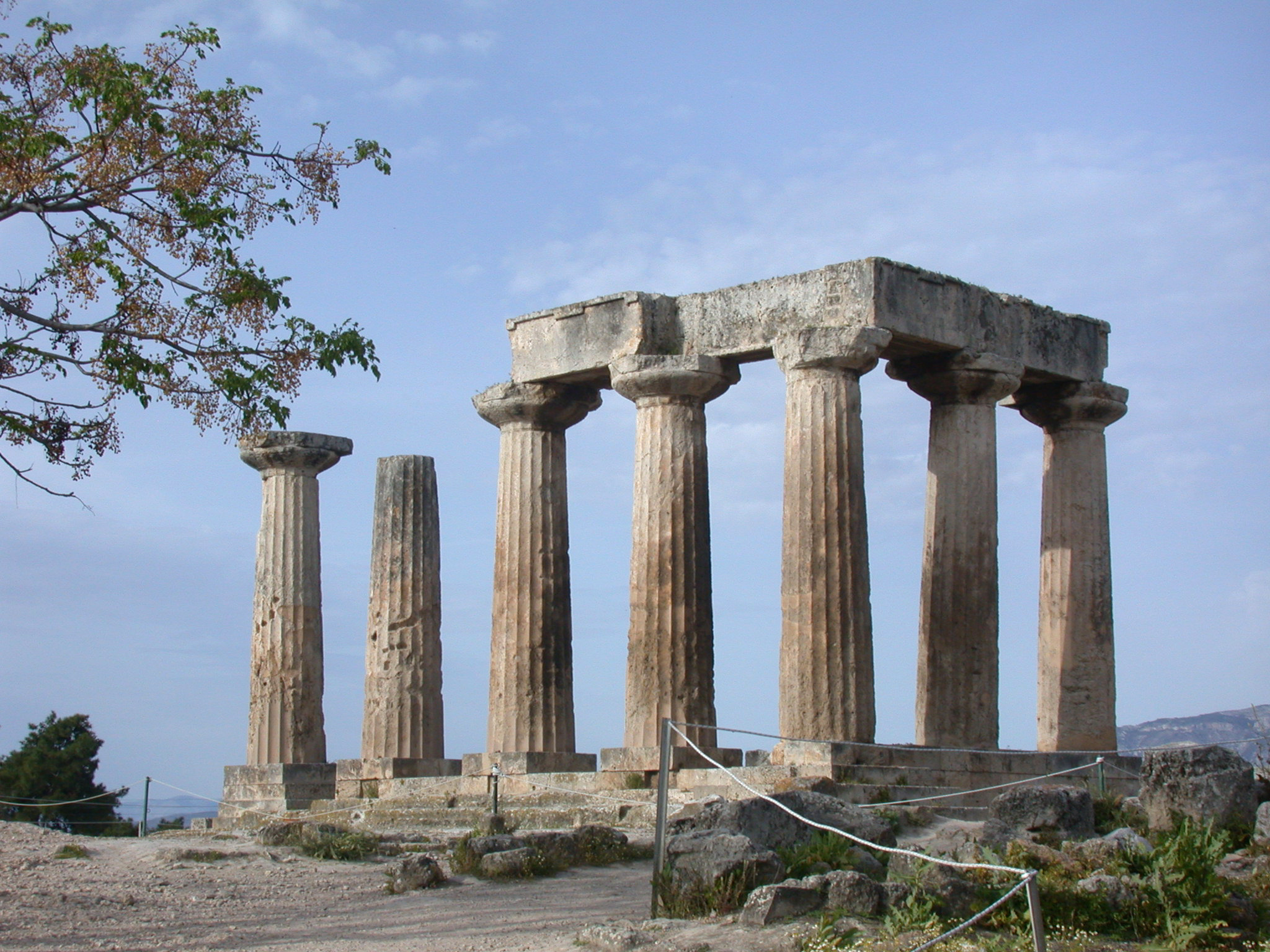
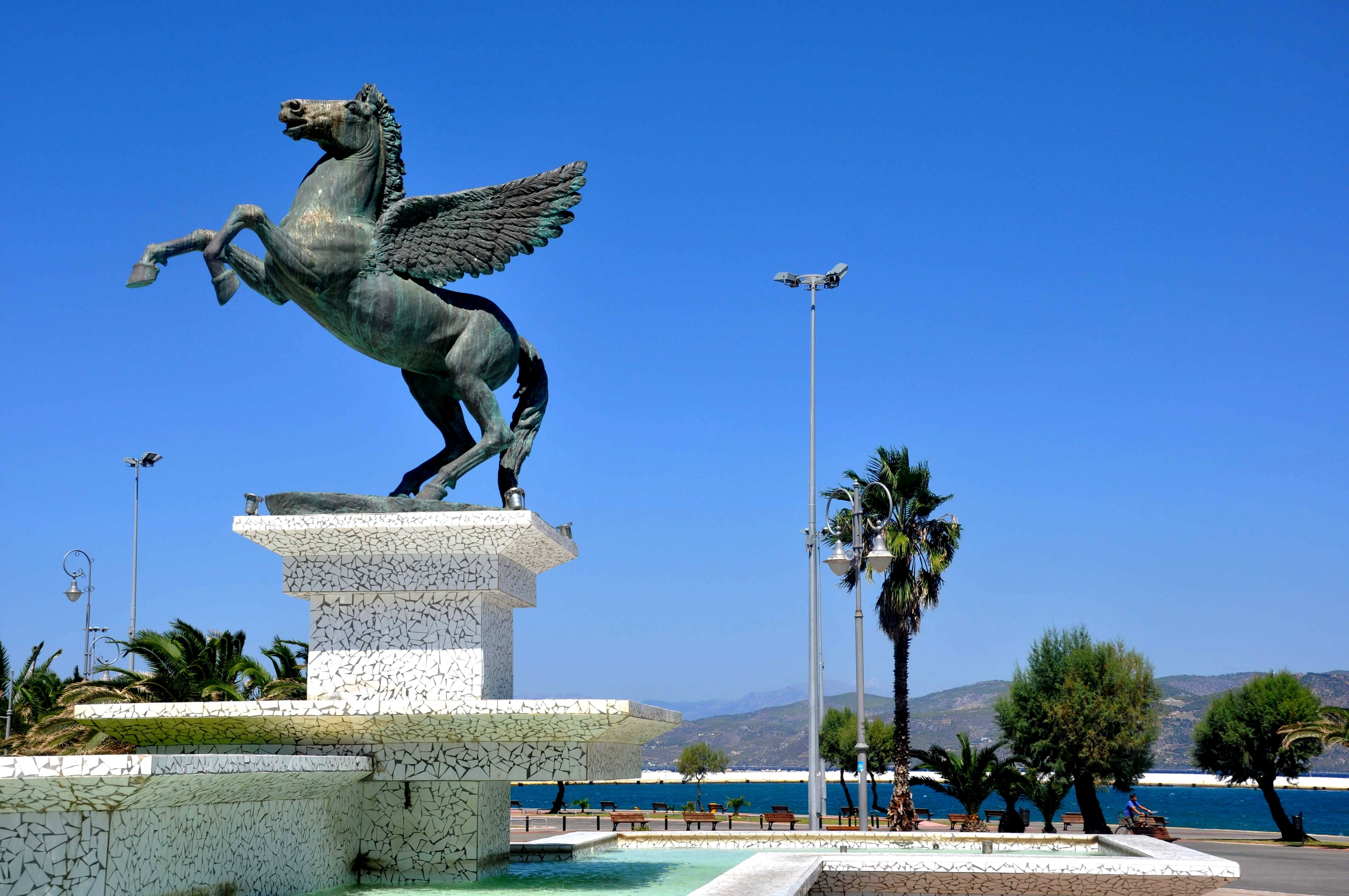
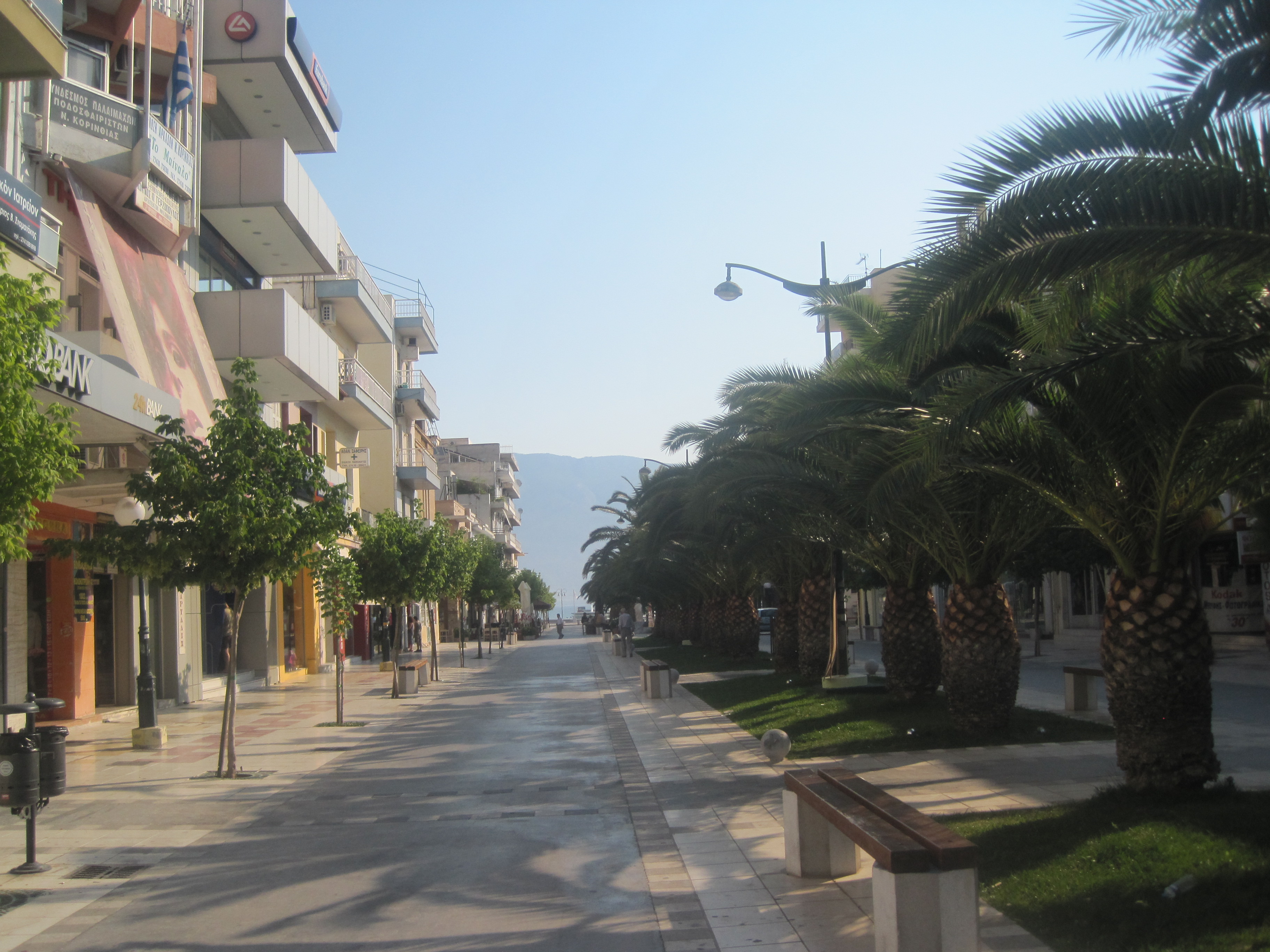
- Clockwise from top left: Corinth Courthouse, the walled gates of Acrocorinth, Corinth Canal, Statue of Pegasus, Ethnikis Antistaseos, Temple of Apollo

- Seal

- Location within the regional unit

- Location within Greece
- Coordinates: 37°56′19″N 22°55′38″E
- Country: Greece
- Administrative region: Peloponnese
- Regional unit: Corinthia
- Municipality: Corinth
- City established: 1858 (168 years ago)

Area
  - Municipal unit: 102.19 km^{2} (39.46 sq mi)
- Highest elevation: 10 m (33 ft)
- Lowest elevation: 0 m (0 ft)

Population (2021)
  - Municipal unit: 38,485
  - Municipal unit density: 376.60/km^{2} (975.40/sq mi)
  - Community: 30,816
- Demonym: Corinthian
- Time zone: UTC+2 (EET)
  - Summer (DST): UTC+3 (EEST)
- Postal code: 20100
- Area code: (+30) 27410
- Vehicle registration: KP
- Website: www.korinthos.gr

Corinth (/ˈkɒrɪnθ/ KORR-inth; Greek: Κόρινθος, romanized: Kórinthos, Modern Greek pronunciation: [ˈkorinθos]) is a city in the Peloponnese in Greece. The successor to the ancient city of Corinth, it is the capital of the Corinthia regional unit and the seat of the municipality of Corinth, of which it is a municipal unit. The municipal unit has a population of 38,485 according to the 2021 census, of whom 30,816 live within the city limits of Corinth.

It was founded as New Corinth (Greek: Νέα Κόρινθος, romanized: Néa Kórinthos) in 1858 after an earthquake destroyed the existing settlement of Corinth, which had developed in and around the site of the ancient city.

== History ==
Corinth derives its name from Ancient Corinth, a city-state of antiquity. The site was occupied from before 3000 BC.

=== Iron Age ===
==== Bacchiad period ====
Historical references begin with the early 8th century BC, when ancient Corinth began to develop as a commercial center. Between the 8th and 7th centuries, the Bacchiad family ruled Corinth. Cypselus overthrew the Bacchiad family, and between 657 and 585 BC, he and his son Periander ruled Corinth as the Tyrants.

=== Classical Age ===
==== Greek period ====
In about 585 BC, an oligarchical government seized power. This government later allied with Sparta within the Peloponnesian League, and Corinth participated in the Persian Wars and Peloponnesian War as an ally of Sparta. After Sparta's victory in the Peloponnesian War, the two allies fell out with one another, and Corinth pursued an independent policy in the various wars of the early 4th century BC, most notably in the Corinthian War. Following the Macedonian hegemony in Greece, the League of Corinth was created by Philip II and then led by Alexander the Great. Corinth also helped Syracuse against Carthage by sending Timoleon. Acrocorinth was the seat of a Macedonian garrison until 243 BC, when the city joined the Achaean League.

==== Roman period ====
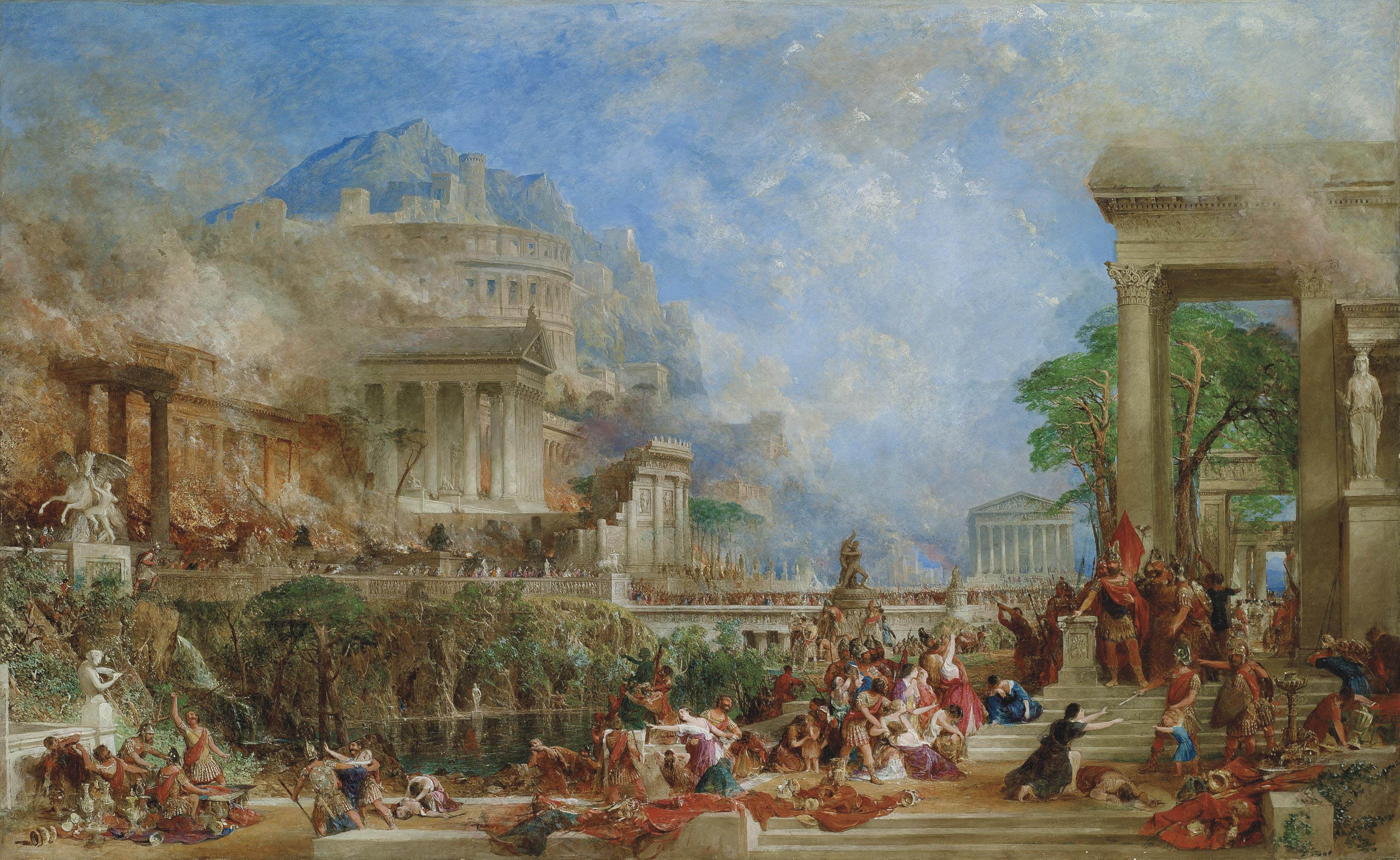
The Roman sack of Corinth in 146 BC (Thomas Allom, 1870)

In 146 BC, Corinth was captured and completely destroyed by the Roman general Lucius Mummius following the Battle of Corinth.

Between 146 BC and 44 BC there was a 102-year hiatus showing a significant drop in activity. The site was not entirely empty as it was occupied by squatters and temporary workers who managed the land as ager publicus (public land) for Rome before the official colony was settled.

In 44 BC, Corinth was a newly rebuilt Roman colony with 16,000 colonists, that flourished and became the administrative capital of the Roman province of Achaea. Under the authority of Julius Caesar, the city was refounded as Colonia Laus Iulia Corinthiensis. Caesar's primary motivation for the 44 BC reconstruction was strategic and the colonists mainly came from the Gens Julii establishing estates for the familia. It provided a settlement for Roman freedmen and veterans while controlling the vital trade route across the Isthmus of Corinth. According to Strabo (Geography 8.6.23), Caesar chose this group to alleviate urban crowding in Rome and provide a loyal, industrious population for the trade hub.

Because the city was rebuilt by Romans, it was laid out in a typical Roman grid and became a Latin-speaking administrative hub, eventually serving as the capital of the province of Achaia. The Lechaion Road became the city's cardo maximus (main north–south axis). Excavations have traced its Roman paving and drainage systems, which were distinct from the earlier Greek pathways. The Greek agora was transformed into a Roman forum (marketplace). They retained some Greek structures, like the South Stoa, but repurposed them to fit the new civic layout. It also included a Roman-style amphitheater (uncommon in Greek cities) and specialized buildings like the Julian Basilica. Excavations of the Roman Villas at Anaploga show a stark hierarchy. While most lived in dense insulae (apartments), the elite built sprawling estates with elaborate mosaics, reflecting a rapid accumulation of wealth through Isthmian trade.

The "Decuriones" were the local city council members. While freedmen were technically barred from high office in Rome, the colonial charter of Corinth allowed them to rise to the rank of decurio. Evidence for this is found in the Corinthian Inscriptions (Vol. 8), which list names of elite officials with Greek roots but Roman citizenship.

To gain religious legitimacy, the new elite sponsored the Isthmian Games. Archaeological finds of "Agonistic Inscriptions" show that the new Roman citizens used these traditional Greek games to display their status to the wider Mediterranean world. One event of the Isthmian Games was held during the spring of AD 51.

In the New Testament, Paul went to Corinth during his second missionary journey (Acts 18), during the reign of Emperor Claudius (r. 41–54). He also wrote letters to the Corinthians and Romans. The Erastus Inscription, while not Jewish, this 1st-century paving stone mentions "Erastus, the Aedile" (a high-ranking city official). In the New Testament, Paul mentions an Erastus in his letter to the Romans (written from Corinth) alongside Jewish companions, illustrating the high social level at which the community intersected with city government. A heavy limestone lintel was discovered near the Lechaion Road (the main thoroughfare) bearing the Greek inscription [SYNA]GOGE EBR[AION]. While the stone itself likely dates to the 4th or 5th century AD, archaeologists often find that later synagogues were built directly on top of earlier 1st-century foundations.

=== Medieval Ages ===
In 857 CE, a major earthquake struck Corinth and its region causing around 45,000 deaths.

=== Modern era ===
In 1858, the old city, now known as Ancient Corinth (Αρχαία Κόρινθος, Archaia Korinthos), located three kilometres (two miles) southwest of the modern city, was totally destroyed by a magnitude 6.5 earthquake. New Corinth (Nea Korinthos) was then built to the north-east of it, on the coast of the Gulf of Corinth. The population exchange between Greece and Turkey in 1923 resulted in an influx of refugees also settling in the city, most of whom came from the western coasts of Asia Minor. At the 1928 census, nearly one out of five residents in Corinth was a refugee. This led to the expansion of the city to the east with the creation of the neighbourhood of Ionia, originally known as Synoikismos. However, in 1928, the city was once again hit by an earthquake, this time of a magnitude of 6.3, largerly destroying it to later be rebuilt on the same site. While still recovering from the earthquake in 1933, a great fire destroyed a part of the city as well.

During the German occupation in World War II, the Germans operated a Dulag Luft transit camp for British, Australian, New Zealander and Serbian prisoners of war and a forced labour camp in the town.

== Geography ==
Located about 78 kilometres (48 mi) west of Athens, Corinth is surrounded by the coastal townlets of (clockwise) Lechaio, Isthmia, Kechries, and the inland townlets of Examilia and the archaeological site and village of ancient Corinth. Natural features around the city include the narrow coastal plain of Vocha, the Corinthian Gulf, the Isthmus of Corinth cut by its canal, the Saronic Gulf, the Oneia Mountains, and the monolithic rock of Acrocorinth, where the medieval acropolis was built.

=== Climate ===
According to the nearby weather station of Velo, operated by the Hellenic National Meteorological Service, Corinth has a hot-summer Mediterranean climate (Köppen climate classification: Csa), with hot, dry summers and cool, rainy winters. The hottest month is July with an average temperature of 28.7 °C (83.7 °F) while the coldest month is January with an average temperature of 9.1 °C (48.4 °F). Corinth receives about 463 mm of rainfall per year and has an average annual temperature of 18.1 °C (64.6 °F).

Climate data for Velo, Corinth (1988–2010)
Month	Jan	Feb	Mar	Apr	May	Jun	Jul	Aug	Sep	Oct	Nov	Dec	Year
Mean daily maximum °C (°F)	13.4 (56.1)	13.9 (57.0)	16.5 (61.7)	20.3 (68.5)	25.7 (78.3)	30.7 (87.3)	33.2 (91.8)	32.9 (91.2)	28.4 (83.1)	23.6 (74.5)	18.5 (65.3)	14.4 (57.9)	22.6 (72.7)
Daily mean °C (°F)	9.1 (48.4)	9.4 (48.9)	11.9 (53.4)	15.7 (60.3)	21.1 (70.0)	26.1 (79.0)	28.7 (83.7)	28.1 (82.6)	23.4 (74.1)	18.8 (65.8)	13.8 (56.8)	10.5 (50.9)	18.1 (64.5)
Mean daily minimum °C (°F)	5.3 (41.5)	5.0 (41.0)	6.5 (43.7)	9.0 (48.2)	12.9 (55.2)	16.8 (62.2)	19.5 (67.1)	19.8 (67.6)	16.9 (62.4)	13.8 (56.8)	9.9 (49.8)	6.9 (44.4)	11.9 (53.3)
Average precipitation mm (inches)	72.0 (2.83)	50.9 (2.00)	53.7 (2.11)	28.7 (1.13)	22.3 (0.88)	6.4 (0.25)	5.0 (0.20)	11.9 (0.47)	19.4 (0.76)	40.8 (1.61)	73.5 (2.89)	78.6 (3.09)	463.2 (18.22)
Average precipitation days	7.7	9.0	8.3	6.0	4.1	2.0	1.1	1.7	4.1	5.8	8.0	10.3	68.1
Average relative humidity (%)	70.6	69.6	68.0	65.8	61.9	58.1	56.3	55.7	59.8	66.8	69.9	70.4	64.4
Source 1: HNMS
Source 2: Humidity 1987-1997

== Demographics ==
Historical population
Year	Pop.	±%
2001	36,991	—
2011	38,132	+3.1%
2021	38,485	+0.9%

The Municipality of Corinth (Δήμος Κορινθίων) had a population of 55,941 according to the 2021 census, the second most populous municipality in the Peloponnese Region after Kalamata. The municipal unit of Corinth had 38,485 inhabitants, of which Corinth itself had 30,816 inhabitants, placing it in second place behind Kalamata among the cities of the Peloponnese Region.

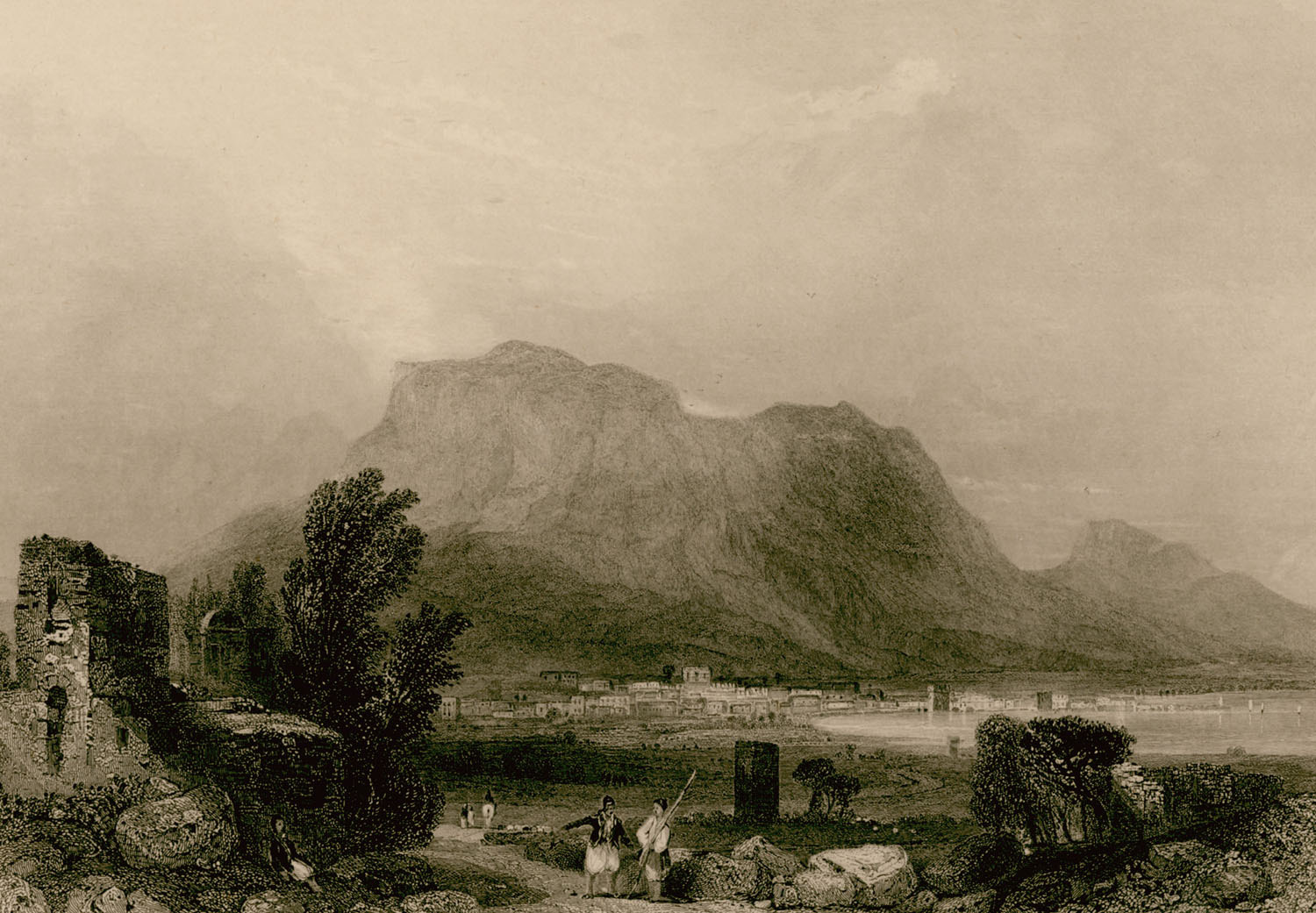
Corinth in 1882

The municipal unit of Corinth (Δημοτική ενότητα Κορινθίων) includes apart from Corinth proper the town of Archaia Korinthos, the town of Examilia, and the smaller settlements of Xylokeriza and Solomos. The municipal unit has an area of 102.187 km^{2}.

== Economy ==
=== Industry ===
Corinth is a major industrial hub at a national level. The Corinth Refinery is one of the largest oil refining industrial complexes in Europe. Ceramic tiles, copper cables, gums, gypsum, leather, marble, meat products, medical equipment, mineral water and beverages, petroleum products, and salt are produced nearby. As of 2005, a period of Economic changes commenced as a large pipework complex, a textile factory and a meat packing facility diminished their operations.

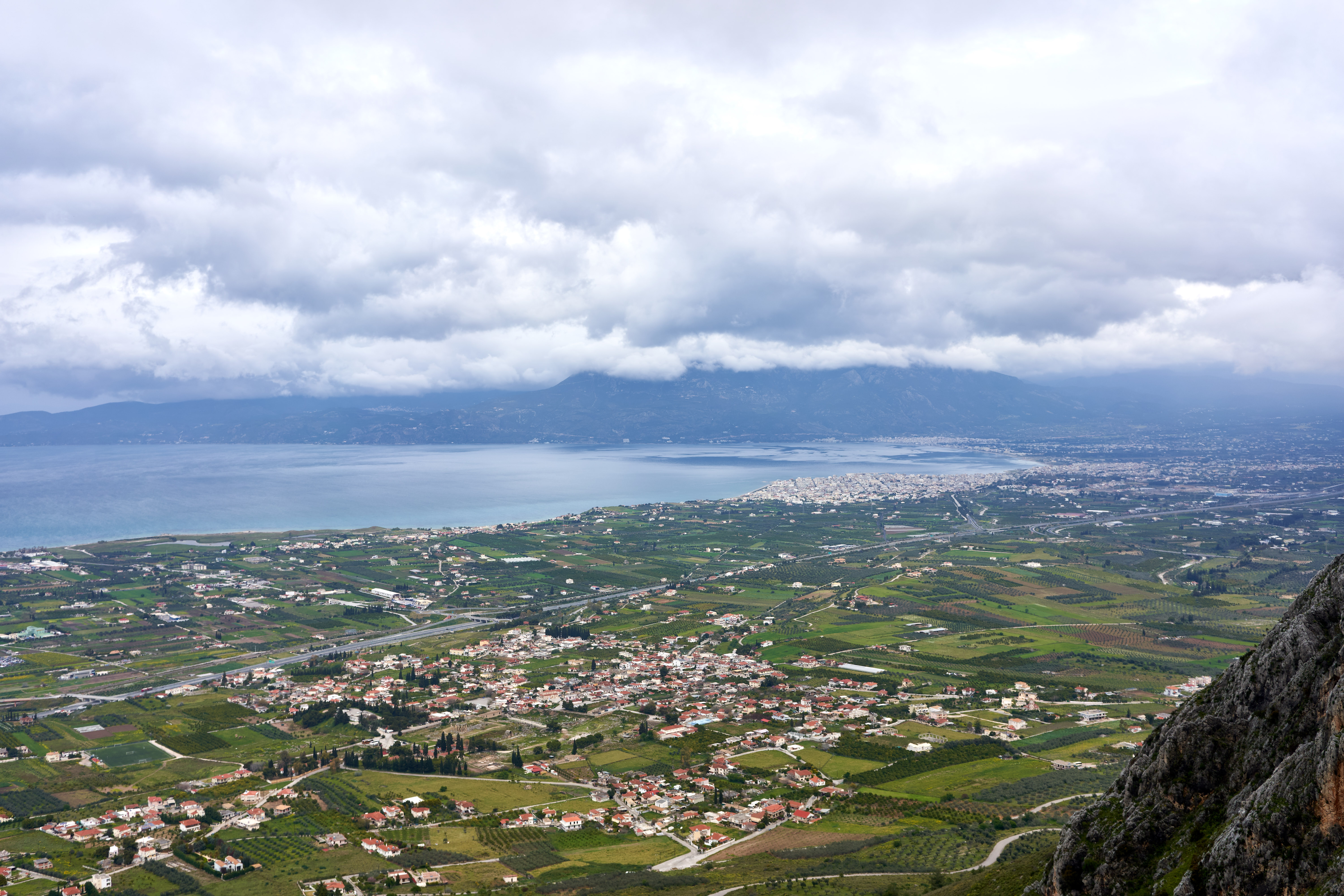
View of the Gulf of Corinth and modern Corinth from the Castle of Acrocorinth

== Transport ==
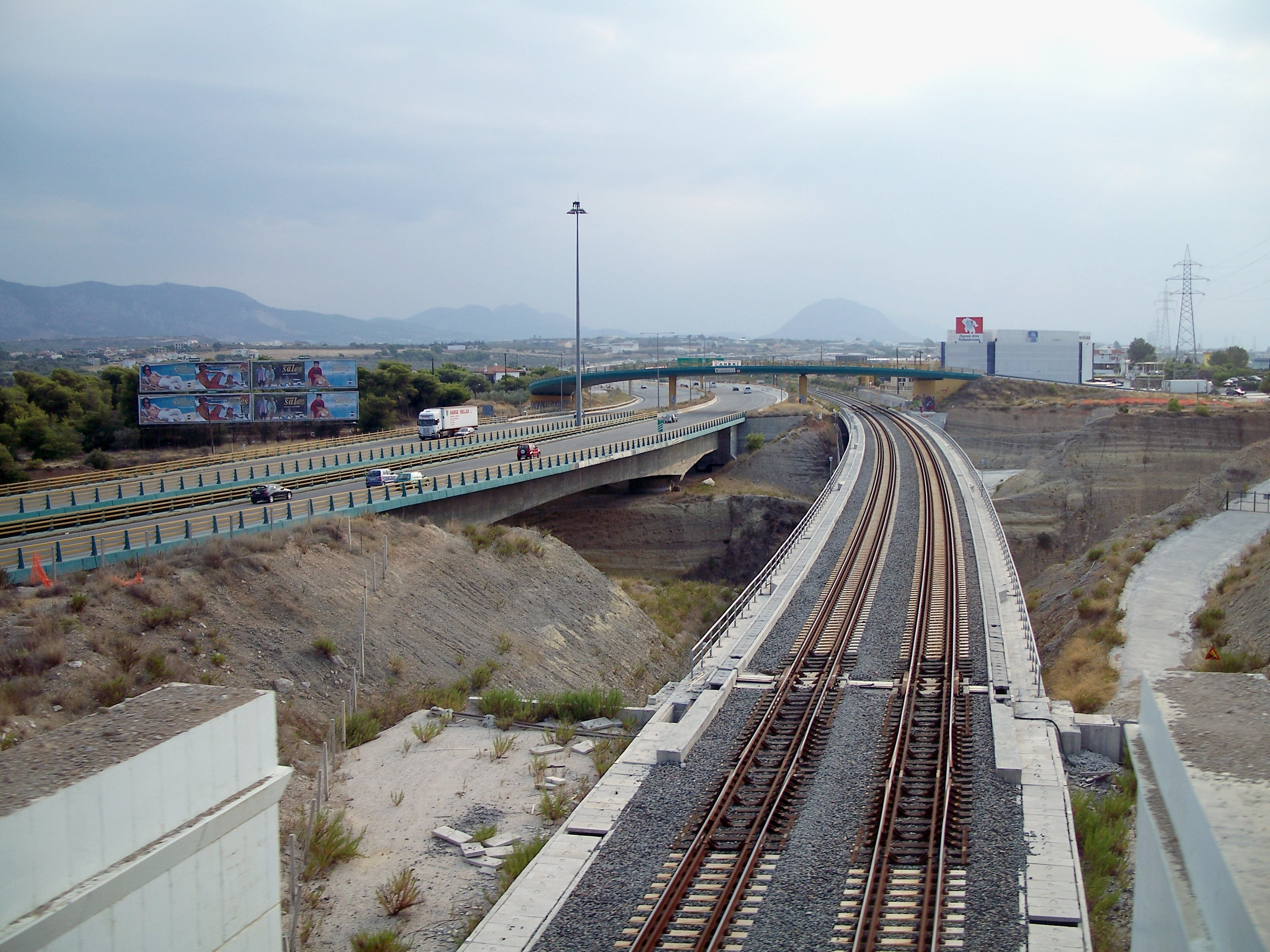
The railway bridge over the Isthmus of Corinth

=== Roads ===
Corinth is a major road hub. The A7 toll motorway for Tripoli and Kalamata, (and Sparta via the A71 toll), branches off the A8/E94 toll motorway from Athens at Corinth. Corinth is the main entry point to the Peloponnesian peninsula, the southernmost area of continental Greece.

=== Bus ===
KTEL Korinthias provides intercity bus service in the peninsula and to Athens via the Isthmos station southeast of the city center. Local bus service is also available.

=== Railways ===
The metre gauge railway from Athens and Pireaeus reached Corinth in 1884. This station closed to regular public transport in 2007. In 2005, two years prior, the city was connected to the Athens Suburban Railway, following the completion of the new Corinth railway station. The journey time from Athens to Corinth is about 55 minutes. The train station is 5 minutes by car from the city centre and parking is available for free.

=== Port ===
The port of Corinth, located north of the city centre and close to the northwest entrance of the Corinth Canal, at 37 56.0' N / 22 56.0' E, serves the local needs of industry and agriculture. It is mainly a cargo exporting facility.

It is an artificial harbour (depth approximately 9 m (30 ft), protected by a concrete mole (length approximately 930 metres, width 100 metres, mole surface 93,000 m2). A new pier finished in the late 1980s doubled the capacity of the port. The reinforced mole protects anchored vessels from strong northern winds.

Within the port operates a customs office facility and a Hellenic Coast Guard post. Sea traffic is limited to trade in the export of local produce, mainly citrus fruits, grapes, marble, aggregates and some domestic imports. The port operates as a contingency facility for general cargo ships, bulk carriers and ROROs, in case of strikes at Piraeus port.

==== Ferries ====
There was formerly a ferry link to Catania, Sicily and Genoa in Italy.

=== Canal ===
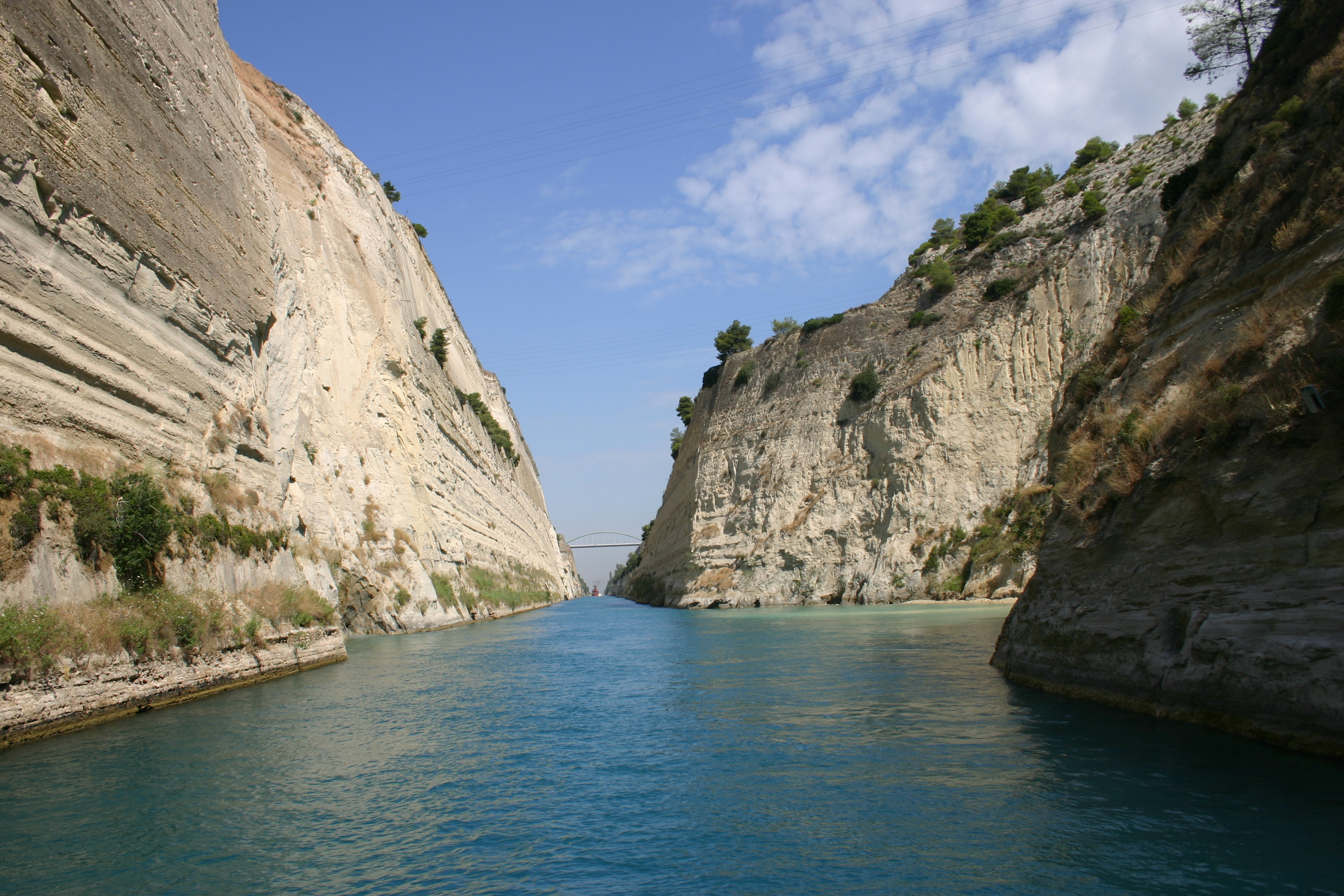
View of the Corinth Canal

The Corinth Canal, carrying ship traffic between the western Mediterranean Sea and the Aegean Sea, is about 4 km (2.5 mi) east of the city, cutting through the Isthmus of Corinth that connects the Peloponnesian peninsula to the Greek mainland, thus effectively making the former an island. The builders dug the canal through the Isthmus at sea level; no locks are employed. It is 6.4 km (4.0 mi) in length and only 21.3 metres (70 ft) wide at its base, making it impassable for most modern ships. It now has little economic importance.

The canal was mooted in ancient times and an abortive effort was made to dig it in around 600 BC by Periander which led him to pave the Diolkos highway instead. Julius Caesar and Caligula both considered digging the canal but died before starting the construction. The emperor Nero then directed the project, which consisted initially of a workforce of 6,000 Jewish prisoners of war, but it was interrupted because of his death. The project resumed only in 1882, after Greece gained independence from the Ottoman Empire, but was hampered by geological and financial problems that bankrupted the original builders. It was finally completed in 1893, but due to the canal's narrowness, navigational problems and periodic closures to repair landslips from its steep walls, it failed to attract the level of traffic anticipated by its operators. It is now used mainly for tourist traffic.

== Sport ==
The city's association football team is P.A.S. Korinthos (Π.Α.Σ. Κόρινθος), established in 1999 after the merger of Pankorinthian Football Club (Παγκορινθιακός) and Corinth Football Club (Κόρινθος). During the 2006–07 season, the team played in the Greek Fourth Division's Regional Group 7. The team went undefeated that season and it earned the top spot. This granted the team a promotion to the Gamma Ethnikí (Third Division) for the 2007–08 season. For the 2025–26 season, P.A.S. Korinthos competed in the Gamma Ethniki (Third Division).

== Twin towns/sister cities ==
Corinth is twinned with:

- (Italy) Syracuse, Sicily
- Jagodina, Serbia

== Notable people ==
- Anastasios Bakasetas (1993–), Greek footballer
- Evangelos Ikonomou (1987–), Greek footballer
- George Kollias (1977–), drummer for US technical death metal band Nile.
- Georgios Leonardopoulos, army officer
- Macarius (1731–1805), Metropolitan bishop of Corinth
- Ioannis Papadiamantopoulos (1766–1826), revolutionary leader during the Greek War of Independence.
- Irene Papas (1929–2022), Greek actress
- Costas Soukoulis (1951–2024), Professor of Physics at Iowa State University
- Konstantinos Triantafyllopoulos (1993–) Greek footballer
- Panagis Tsaldaris (1868–1936), Greek politician and prime minister of Greece
- Panagiotis Tzanavaras (1964–), Greek footballer and football manager
- Nikolaos Zafeiriou (1871–1947), Greek artillery officer

== Other locations named after Corinth ==
Due to its ancient history and the presence of St. Paul the Apostle in Corinth some locations all over the world have been named Corinth.

== Gallery ==
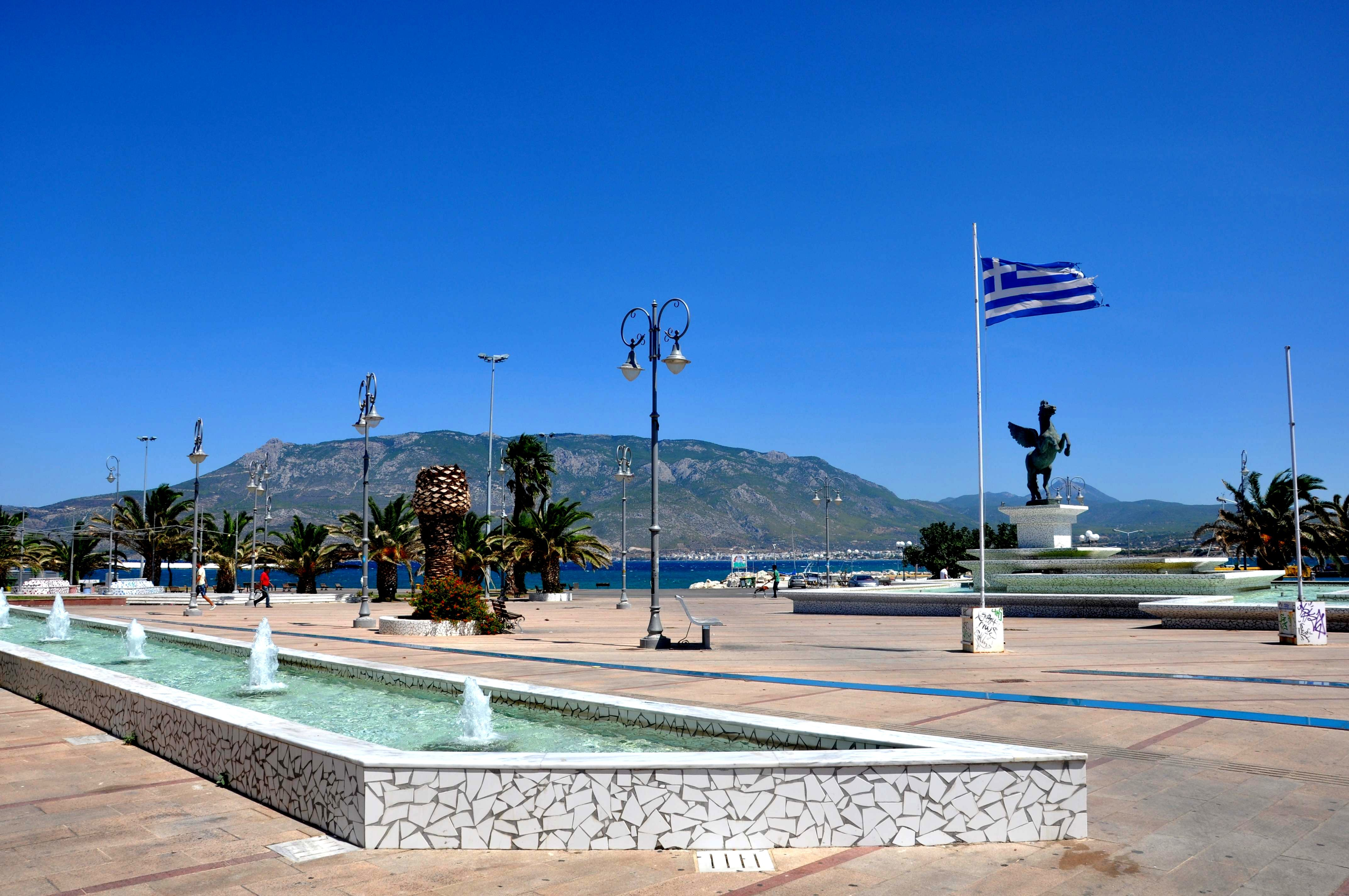
Pegasus Square in New Corinth

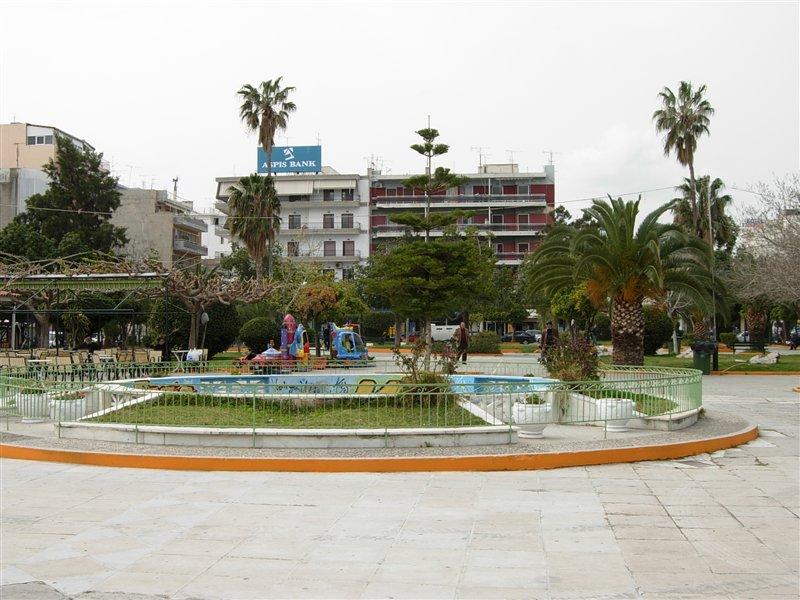
View of the Central Square of the city

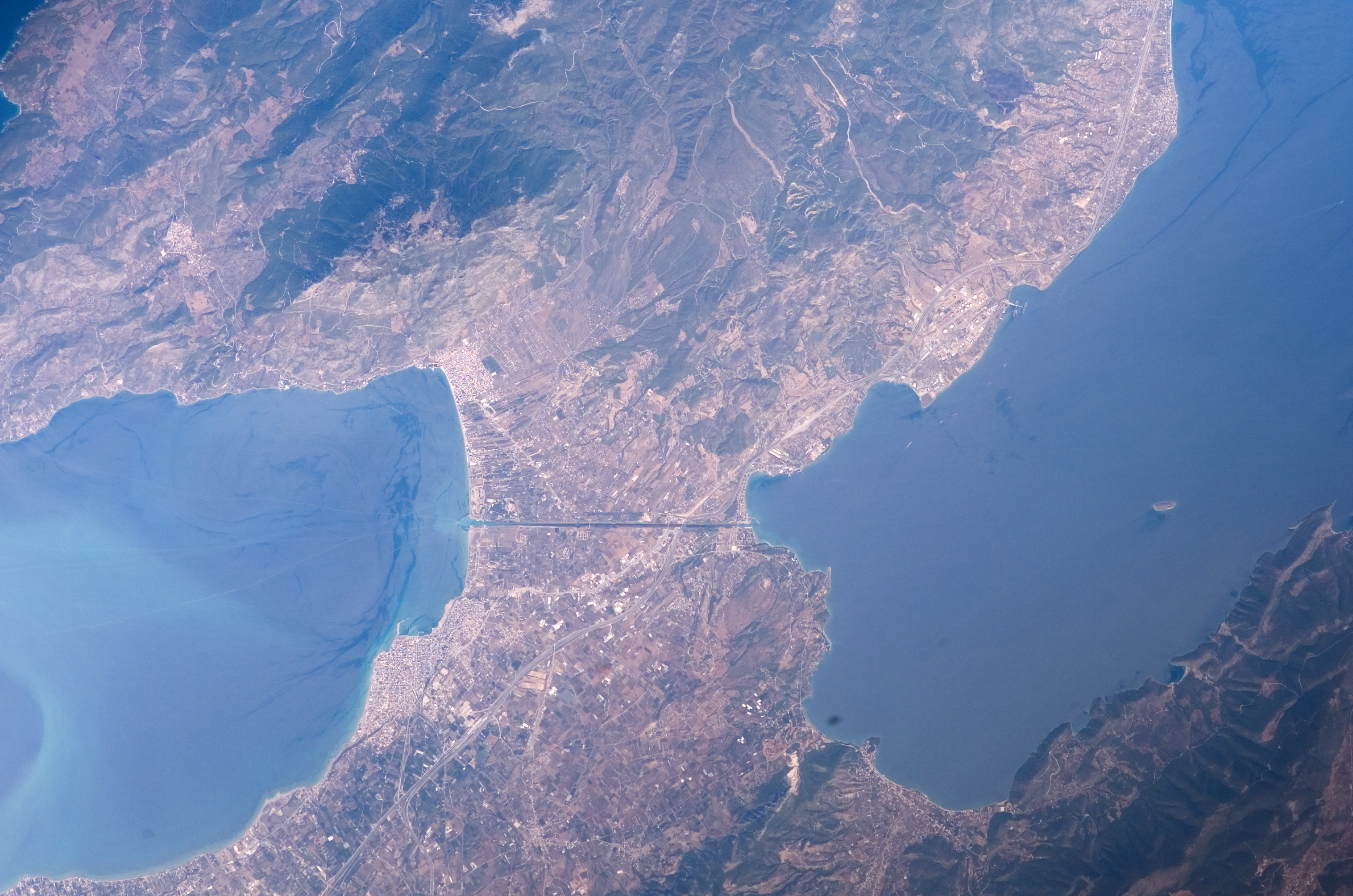
Aerial photograph of the Isthmus of Corinth

== See also ==
- Corinth Canal
- Corinth Excavations
- Zante currant
- List of traditional Greek place names
