= Oneia Mountains =

Mountain range in Corinthia, Greece

Coordinates: 37.869117°N 22.928955°E

The Oneia Mountains (Greek: Όνεια Όρη or Oneia Ori) are a low mountain range in Corinthia, northeastern Peloponnese, Greece. The range extends 9 km from west to east, starting west of the village of Solomos, passing south of the village of Xylokeriza and ending near the Bay of Kechries, on the Saronic Gulf.

The highest peaks are Profitis Ilias (Greek: Προφήτης Ηλίας), at 581m, and Oxy (Greek: Οξύ), at 562 meters. The other two peaks measure 507m and 229m respectively.

The range is also known in the singular as Mount Oneio (Greek: Όνειο όρος) or Mount Oneion, as well as the Xylokeriza Mountains (Greek: τα βουνά της Ξυλοκέριζας).
