= Philip Carpenter =

Philip Carpenter is the name of:

- Philip Carpenter (1776–1833), founder of scientific instrument maker Carpenter and Westley
- Philip Herbert Carpenter (1852–1891), expert on the morphology of the echinoderms
- Philip Pearsall Carpenter (1819–1877), minister and malacologist
