= Gavino Gulia =

Maltese botanist and author

- Born: 18 June 1835; Cospicua (Bormla), British Malta
- Died: 24 December 1889 (aged 54)
- Citizenship: Maltese
- Spouse: Giulia Gulia
- Children: Giovanni Gulia
- Relatives: Pietro Paolo Gulia (father)
- Scientific career
- Fields: Natural sciences, Botany, Hygiene, Forensic medicine and Zoology
- Workplaces: University of Malta

Gavino Gulia (18 June 1835 – 24 December 1889) was a Maltese medical doctor, botanist, naturalist, university professor, scientific writer, and lecturer. He was one of the leading Maltese naturalists of the nineteenth century and made important contributions to the study of Malta's flora and fauna, as well as to medicine and scientific publishing.

== Early life and education ==
Gavino Gulia was born in Cospicua (Bormla), Malta, on 18 June 1835, to Pietro Paolo Gulia, a physician, and Maddalena. His father was a well-known local doctor with an extensive medical practice. Gulia was described by contemporary biographers as exceptionally intelligent and possessing an unusually good memory. As a child, he was already able to recite lengthy passages from the works of Italian poets such as Pietro Metastasio and Torquato Tasso.

He initially studied at the Archbishop's Seminary before continuing his education at the University of Malta. There he studied philosophy under Salvatore Cumbo, mathematics under Professor Pullicino, physics under Giuseppe Wettinger, and botany and zoology under the prominent Maltese botanist Stefano Zerafa. He also studied medicine and surgery under Professors Schinas and Galland.

Gulia qualified as a physician at the age of 21. Although he practised medicine throughout his life, his principal intellectual interest increasingly became the natural sciences, particularly botany. His mentor Stefano Zerafa recognised his ability in the field and encouraged him to devote himself more fully to the study of natural history.

== Studies in Paris and scientific recognition ==
Gulia later travelled to Paris to continue his medical and scientific studies. The contemporary biography states that he came into contact with leading figures in French medicine and surgery and was awarded a diploma as a member of the Société de Médecine Pratique de Paris. He was also elected or admitted to several scientific and horticultural societies, including the Accademia Gioenia of Catania, the Horticultural Society of the Lower Rhine, and the Société Botanique de France.

These associations reflected the international recognition he had gained as a physician and naturalist. His work was known beyond Malta, and the contemporary account records that foreign writers, including the botanist Filippo Parlatore and the naturalist Philip Carpenter, referred favourably to his work.

== Medical career ==
After returning to Malta, Gulia practised medicine in his native Cospicua. He was known for providing medical treatment to poor patients without charge and, when necessary, supplying medicines at his own expense. His reputation was such that other physicians sometimes sought his advice in difficult medical cases.

He was also involved in public-health and medico-legal matters. His scientific periodical Il Barth addressed medical, legal-medical, and natural-science questions.

== Botany and natural history ==
Gulia's first scientific publication appeared in 1855 under the title Repertorio Botanico Maltese. The work listed Maltese plants alphabetically according to their Maltese names and included information relating to their natural history.

The contemporary biography also describes Gulia as having produced an important flora of Malta and a repertory of botanical sciences while still a young man. These early works attracted the attention of Sir William Reid, then Governor of Malta, who became a patron and friend of the young scientist.

Gulia's interests extended beyond botany. He studied zoology and entomology and contributed to the study of Malta's invertebrate fauna. In 1861, he described a new form of the endemic door-snail Muticaria macrostoma, naming it Muticaria macrostoma var. mamotica in honour of the naturalist and conchologist Giuseppe Mamo. The form is associated with Munxar, Gozo.

In 1857, at the invitation of Governor Sir William Reid, Gulia delivered a series of lectures on entomology at San Anton Palace. These lectures were subsequently published as Corso elementare di entomologia Maltese data nel Palazzo di San Antonio.

== Professor at the University of Malta ==
In 1880, Gulia succeeded Giovanni Carlo Grech Delicata as professor at the University of Malta. He held a chair associated with natural history and forensic medicine, and contemporary accounts also associate his academic work with botany, zoology, and hygiene.

The appointment placed Gulia among the principal scientific figures of nineteenth-century Malta. He combined university teaching with medical practice, scientific research, writing, and public lectures.

== Il Barth ==
Gulia founded Il Barth, a scientific periodical devoted to medicine and the natural sciences. The journal was first published in July 1871 and continued until 1877.

The journal was named after Joseph Barth, a Maltese physician who had achieved international prominence as an ophthalmologist and physician to Emperor Joseph II. Gulia used the periodical to discuss medical and medico-legal questions, translate scientific material from foreign journals, and publish studies relating to Maltese medicine and natural history.

The journal also helped disseminate the work of Maltese scientists and physicians. According to the contemporary biographical account, Gulia's scientific reputation consequently spread in Britain, France, and Italy.

== Scientific and literary work ==
Gulia was a highly educated scholar whose interests extended beyond medicine and natural history. His contemporaries described him as proficient in several languages, including Latin, English, French, German, and Spanish, and as deeply knowledgeable about Italian literature.

He wrote scientific papers, monographs, biographies, obituaries, speeches, and literary works. Among his writings were a biography of the Maltese physician Tommaso Chetcuti, speeches delivered on academic occasions, and biographical and historical writings concerning Maltese physicians. He also wrote about art, including the paintings of Giuseppe Calì in the parish church of Cospicua.

At the time of his death, he was reportedly preparing a major botanical work which, according to his contemporary biographer, would have further enhanced his scientific reputation.

== Death ==
Gavino Gulia died on 24 December 1889. The Times of Malta describes his death as resulting from blood poisoning.

His death was regarded as a significant loss to Maltese medicine and natural science. The contemporary biographical account portrayed him as one of the most distinguished Maltese scientists of his time, whose work had brought recognition to Malta in scientific circles abroad.

== Legacy ==
Gulia is remembered as one of the principal pioneers of nineteenth-century Maltese natural history. His work helped advance the scientific study of Malta's plants, insects, molluscs, and other aspects of the islands' natural environment.

He also played an important role in the development of scientific publishing in Malta through Il Barth, and in scientific education through his lectures and his academic work at the University of Malta. His son, Giovanni Gulia, later continued the family's contribution to Maltese natural history.
