= Loutra Elenis =

Village in Corinthia, Greece

Coordinates: 37.866°N 22.997°E

Loutra Elenis (Greek: Λουτρά Ελένης, also: Λουτρά Ωραίας Ελένης Loutra Oraias Elenis, lit. the Baths of beautiful Helen) is a village in Corinthia, Greece. It is situated on the coast of the Saronic Gulf, about 10 km (6.2 mi) southeast of Corinth. It is part of the community of Galataki within the municipal unit of Saronikos. Its population is 1,005 (2021). It is situated on the Greek National Road 70 between Corinth and Epidaurus.

== See also ==
- List of settlements in Corinthia
