= Lesbos =

Greek island in the North Aegean

Lesbos Περιφερειακή ενότητα Λέσβος
- Regional unit
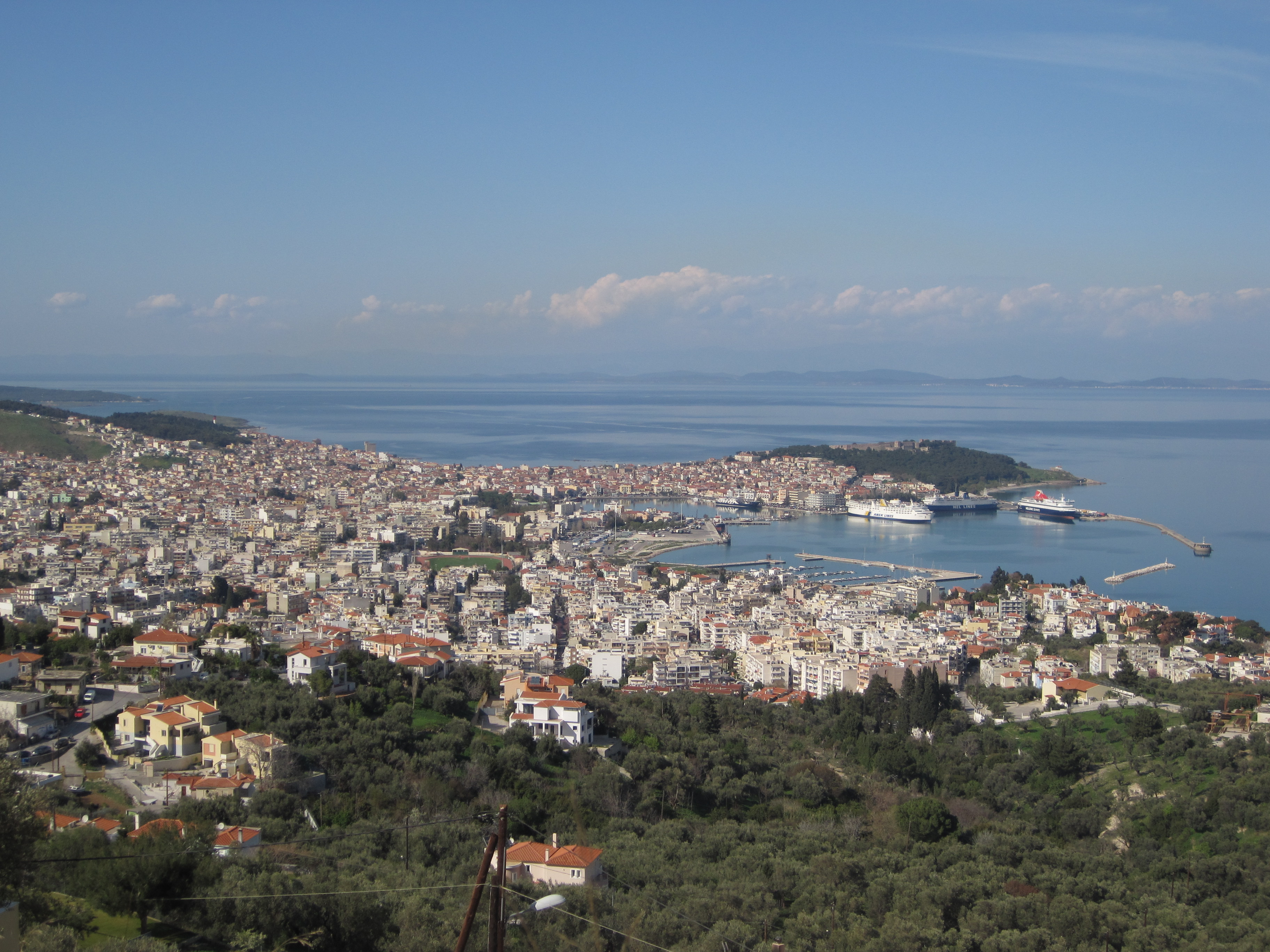
- Mytilene

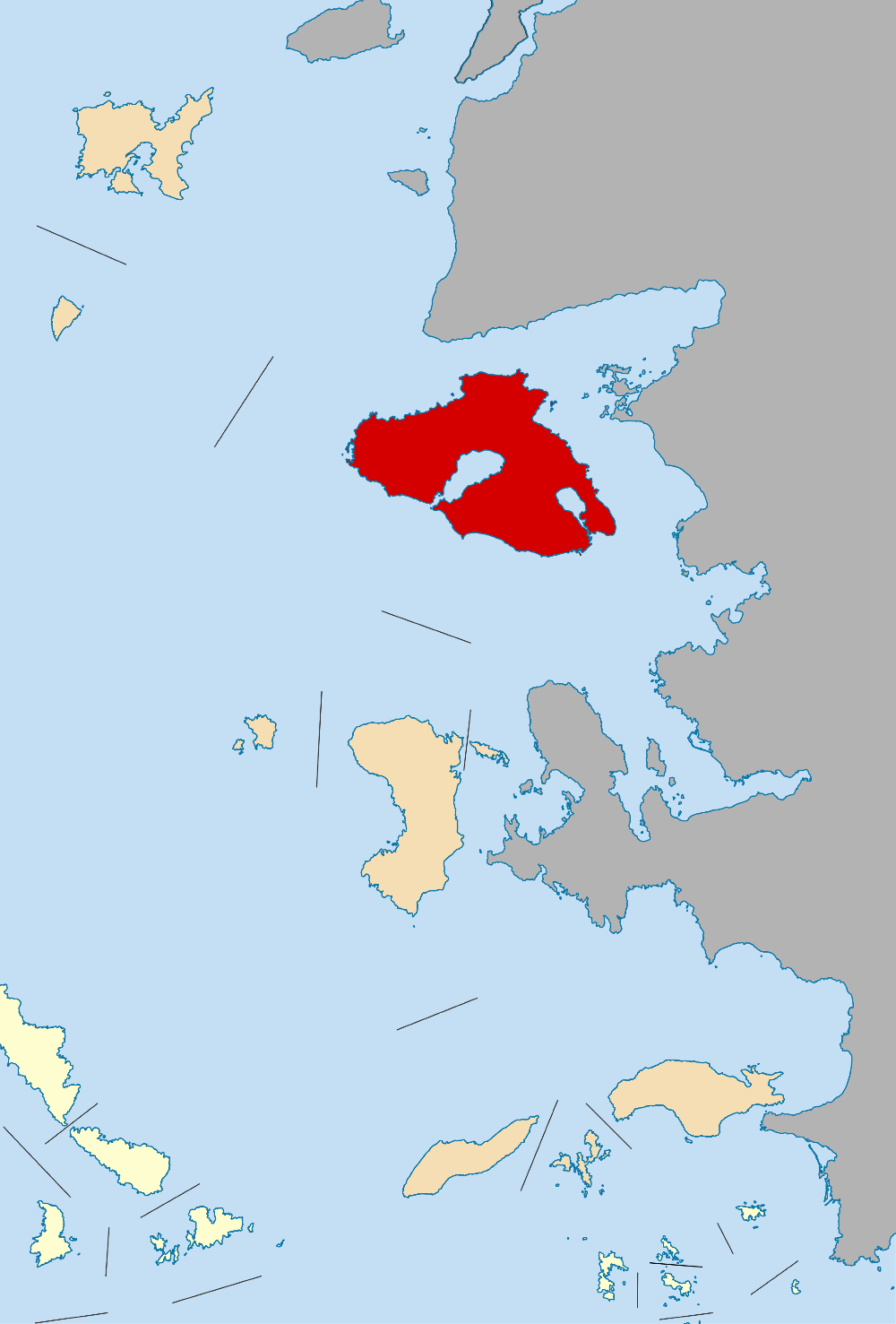
- Lesbos within the North Aegean

- Location within Greece
- Coordinates: 39.21°N 26.28°E
- Country: Greece
- Administrative region: North Aegean
- Seat: Mytilene

Area
  - Total: 1,633 km^{2} (631 sq mi)

Population (2021)
  - Total: 83,755
  - Density: 51.29/km^{2} (132.8/sq mi)
- Demonym(s): Lesbian, Lesvian
- Time zone: UTC+2 (EET)
  - Summer (DST): UTC+3 (EEST)
- Postal code: 81x xx
- Area code: 225x0

Lesbos or Lesvos (Greek: Λέσβος, romanized: Lésvos [ˈlezvos]) is a Greek island located in the northeastern Aegean Sea. It has an area of 1,633 km^{2} (631 sq mi), with approximately 400 km (249 mi) of coastline, making it the third largest island in Greece and the eighth largest in the Mediterranean. It is separated from Asia Minor by the narrow Mytilini Strait. On the southeastern coast is the island's capital and largest city, Mytilene (Μυτιλήνη), whose name is also used for the island as a whole. Lesbos is a separate regional unit with the seat in Mytilene, which is also the capital of the larger North Aegean region. The region includes the islands of Lesbos, Chios, Ikaria, Lemnos, and Samos. The total population of the island was 83,755 in 2021. A third of the island's inhabitants live in the capital, while the remainder are concentrated in small towns and villages. The largest are Plomari, Agia Paraskevi, Polichnitos, Agiassos, Eresos, Gera, and Molyvos (the ancient Mythimna).

According to later Greek writers, Mytilene was founded in the 11th century BC by the family Penthilidae, who arrived from Thessaly and ruled the city-state until a popular revolt (590–580 BC) led by Pittacus of Mytilene ended their rule. In fact, the archaeological and linguistic records may indicate a late Iron Age arrival of Greek settlers, although references in Late Bronze Age Hittite archives indicate a likely Greek presence then. According to Homer's Iliad, Lesbos was part of the kingdom of Priam, which ruled from Troy. In the Middle Ages, it was under Byzantine and then Genoese rule. Lesbos was conquered by the Ottoman Empire in 1462. The Ottomans then ruled the island until the First Balkan War in 1912, when it became part of the Kingdom of Greece.

== Names ==
The English name Lesbos (pronounced /ˈlɛzbɒs/, also US: /ˈlɛzbəs, -boʊs/) is from Ancient Greek Λέσβος (Lésbos). The name appears in Late Bronze Age Hittite texts as Lazpa (Hittite: 𒆷𒊍𒉺 Lāzpa). The earliest reference to Lesbos in Greek texts comes from the Homeric poems, where it is described as "well-built". The etymology of the name is obscure, but may have originally meant 'forested', 'wooded'.

In Modern Greek, the letter beta ⟨β⟩ is pronounced and transliterated as [v], thus producing the alternative form Lesvos. An older name for the island that was maintained in Aeolic Greek was Ἴσσα (Íssa). Pliny the Elder also refers to the island with the names ἱμερτή (himertḗ, 'desirable') and Λασία (Lasía, often understood as 'shaggy'). In Greece, Lesbos is commonly referred to as Mytilene (Μυτιλήνη) after its capital. Some suggest that the name derives from the Anatolian root "muwa" meaning power, while others have suggested a link to the ancient Greek word μυτίλος (mytilos), meaning mussel, or a type thereof. The ending -ene appears to be the common Greek place name suffix (-enos in masculine) indicating provenance. The island is also sometimes called the "Island of the Poets", alluding to renowned native poets like Alcaeus and Sappho.

== History ==
=== Prehistory ===
The oldest artifacts found on the island may date to the late Paleolithic period. Important archaeological sites on the island are the Neolithic cave of Kagiani, probably a refuge for shepherds, the Neolithic settlement of Chalakies.

=== Early Bronze Age ===
Lesbos has been inhabited since at least 3000 BC. There is the extensive habitation of Thermi (3000–1000 BC). The largest habitation is found in Lisvori, dating back to 2800–1900 BC, part of which is submerged in shallow coastal waters.

=== Late Bronze Age ===
Lesbos (Lāzpa) is mentioned in two Hittite texts from the Late Bronze Age, a period during which the island appears to have been a dependent of the Seha River Land. The Manapa-Tarhunta letter recounts an incident in which a group of purple-dyers from Lesbos defected from the Sehan king.

=== Ancient and Classical era ===
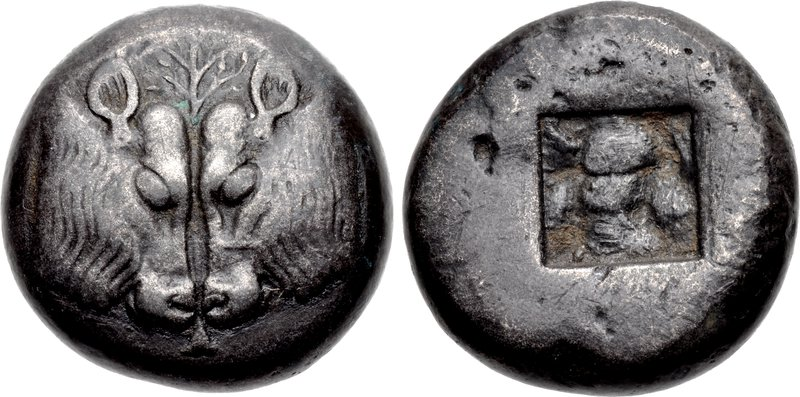
Coin of Lesbos under the Achaemenid Empire, c. 510–480 BC

According to Classical Greek mythology, Lesbos was the patron god of the island. Macareus of Rhodes was reputedly the first king whose many daughters bequeathed their names to some of the present larger towns. In Classical myth his sister, Canace, was killed to have him made king. The place names with female origins are claimed by some to be much earlier settlements named after local goddesses, who were replaced by gods; however, there is little evidence to support this. Homer refers to the island as "Macaros edos," the seat of Macar. Hittite records from the Late Bronze Age name the island Lazpa and must have considered its population significant enough to allow the Hittites to "borrow their gods" (presumably idols) to cure their king when the local gods were not forthcoming. It is believed that emigrants from mainland Greece, mainly from Thessaly, entered the island and Aeolis in the opposite coast, in the Late Bronze Age, and bequeathed it with the Aeolic dialect of the Greek language, whose written form survives in the poems of Sappho, amongst others. In classical times, the cities of the island formed a pentapolis, comprising Mytilene, Methymna, Antissa, Eresos, and Pyrrha. Pyrrha was destroyed in an earthquake in 231 BC, and Antissa by the Roman Republic in 168 BC.

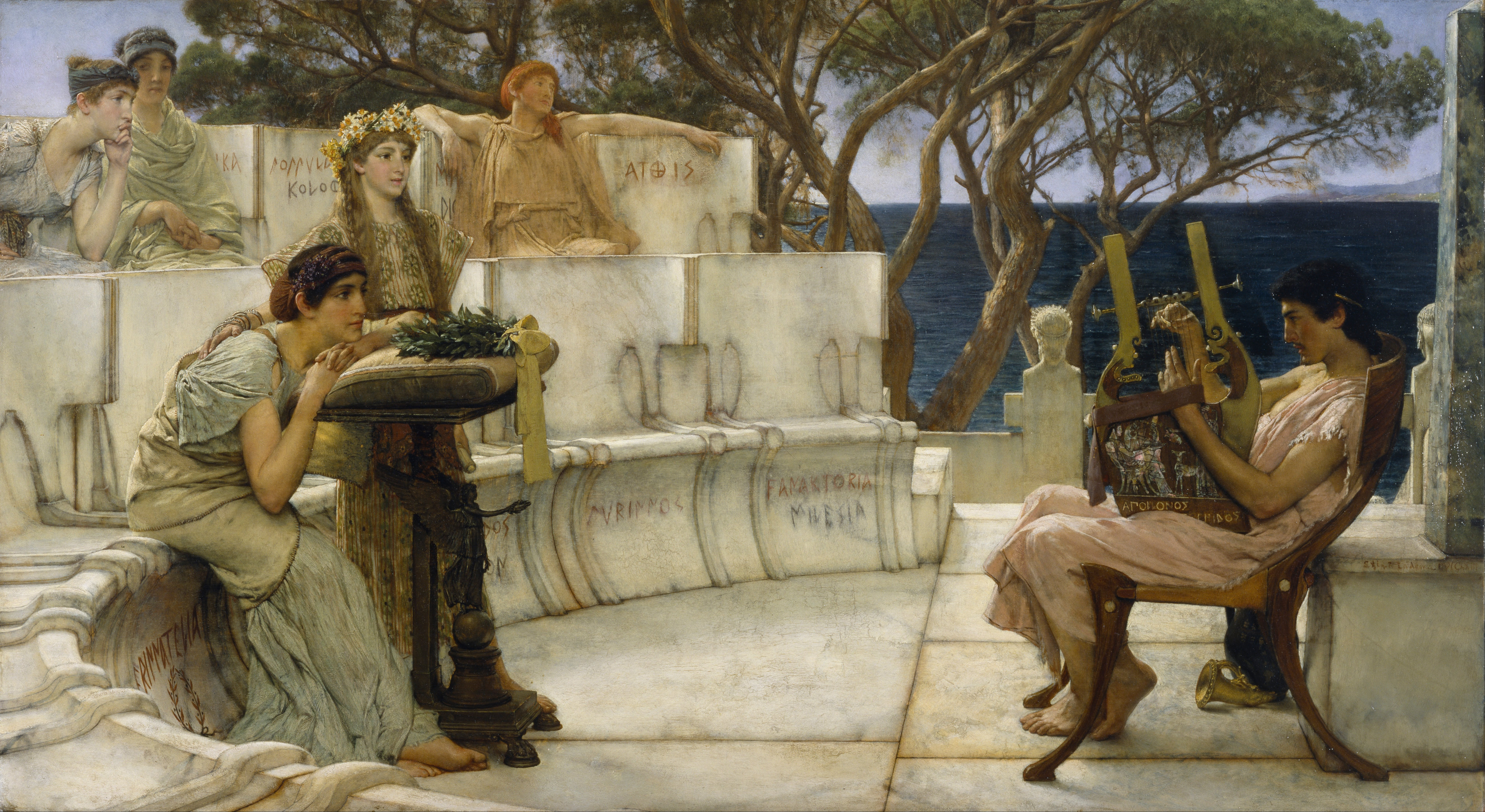
Sappho listens as the poet Alcaeus plays a kithara. (Painting by Lawrence Alma-Tadema, 1881)

Two of the nine lyric poets in the Ancient Greek canon, Sappho and Alcaeus, were from Lesbos. Phaenias wrote history. The seminal artistic creativity of those times brings to mind the myth of Orpheus to whom Apollo gave a lyre and the Muses taught to play and sing. When Orpheus incurred the wrath of the god Dionysus he was dismembered by the Maenads and of his body parts his head and his lyre found their way to Lesbos where they have "remained" ever since. Pittacus was one of the Seven Sages of Greece. In classical times, Hellanicus advanced historiography and Theophrastus, the father of botany, succeeded Aristotle as the head of the Lyceum. Aristotle and Epicurus lived there for some time, and it is there that Aristotle began systematic zoological investigations.

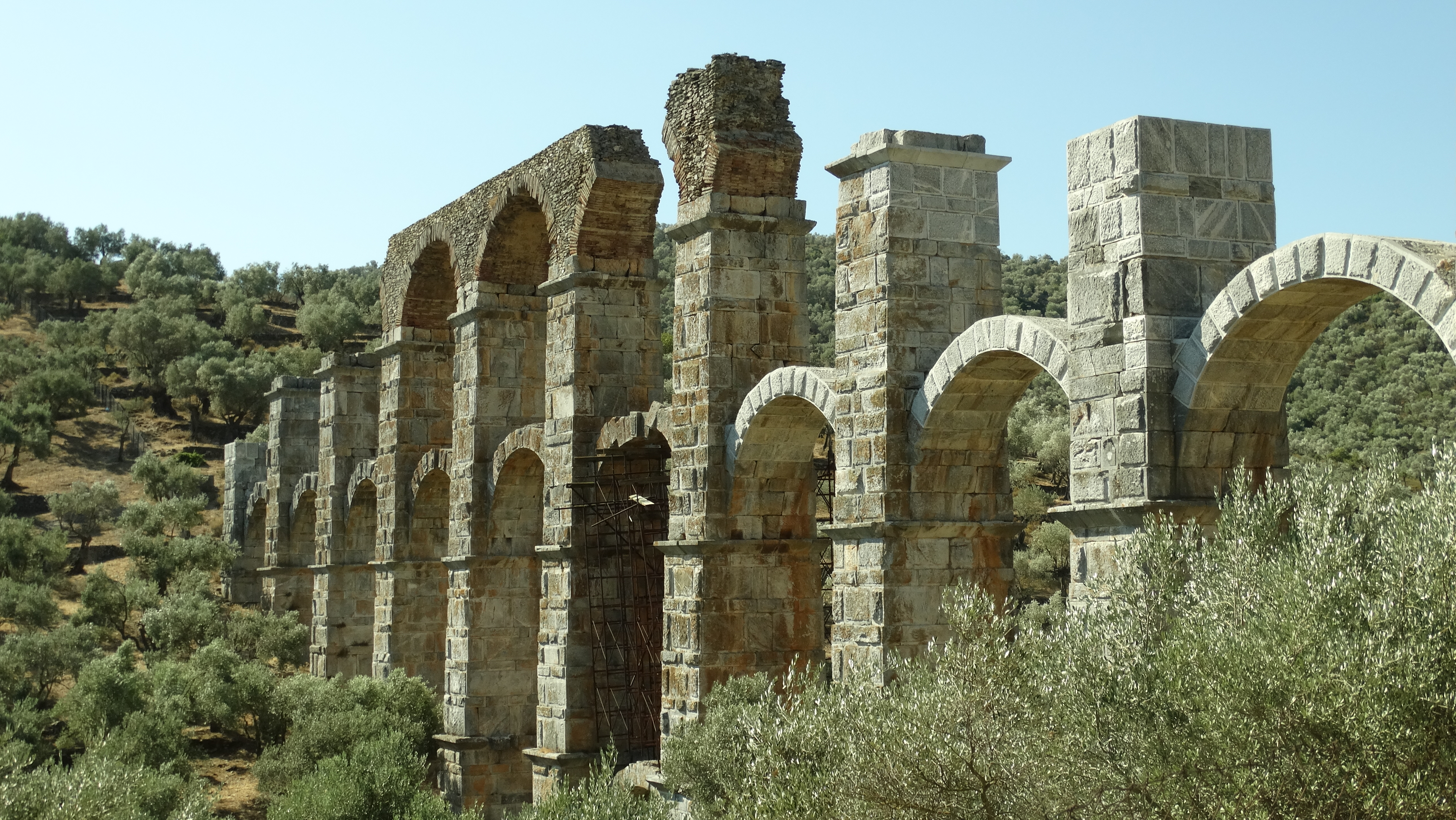
View of the Roman aqueduct

Theophanes, the historian who recorded Pompey's campaigns, was also from Lesbos. As the Greek novel Daphnis and Chloe is set on Lesbos, the author, Longus, is usually assumed to be from the island. The abundant grey pottery ware found on the island and the worship of Cybele, the great mother-goddess of Anatolia, suggest the cultural continuity of the population from Neolithic times. When the Persian king Cyrus the Great defeated Croesus (546 BC) the Ionic Greek cities of Anatolia and the adjacent islands became Persian subjects and remained such until the Persians were defeated by the Greeks at the Battle of Salamis (480 BC). The island was governed by an oligarchy in archaic times, followed by quasi-democracy in classical times. Around this time, Arion developed the type of poem called dithyramb, the progenitor of tragedy, and Terpander invented the seven-note musical scale for the lyre. For a short period it was a member of the Athenian confederacy, its apostasy from which is recounted by Thucydides in the Mytilenian Debate, in Book III of his History of the Peloponnesian War. In Hellenistic times, the island belonged to various Diadochi of Alexander the Great until 79 BC, when it passed into Roman hands. Remnants of its Roman medieval history are three impressive castles. The cities of Mytilene and Methymna have been bishoprics since the 5th century. By the early 10th century, Mytilene had been raised to the status of a metropolitan see. Methymna achieved the same by the 12th century.

=== Middle Ages and Byzantine era ===
During the Middle Ages, Lesbos belonged to the Byzantine Empire. In 802, the Byzantine Empress Irene was exiled to Lesbos after her deposition and died there. The island served as a gathering base for the fleet of the rebel Thomas the Slav in the early 820s. In the late 9th century, it was heavily raided by the Emirate of Crete. As a result, the inhabitants of Eresos abandoned their town and settled in Mount Athos. In the 10th century, it was part of the theme of the Aegean Sea, while in the late 11th century it formed a dioikesis (fiscal district) under a kourator in Mytilene. In c. 1089–1093, the island was briefly occupied by the Seljuk Turkish emir Tzachas, ruler of Smyrna, but he was unable to capture Methymna, which resisted throughout. In the 12th century, the island became a frequent target for plundering raids by the Republic of Venice.

After the Fourth Crusade (1202–1204), the island passed to the Latin Empire, but was reconquered by the Empire of Nicaea sometime after 1224. The notable Byzantine general Alexios Philanthropenos was then named briefly governor of Lesbos in 1328, and again in 1336. He ruled the island thereafter, probably until his death in the 1340s.

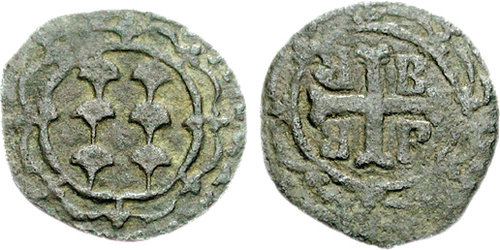
Denaro of Francesco II Gattilusio, lord of Lesbos (1384–1403)

In 1354, it was granted as a dowry and fief to the Genoese Francesco I Gattilusio by the Byzantine emperor John V Palaiologos. The Gattilusio family ruled the island for over a century, engaging in fortifications at the Castle of Mytilene, Molyvos (ancient Methymna), and the fort of Agios Theodoros at the site of ancient Antissa.

=== Ottoman era ===
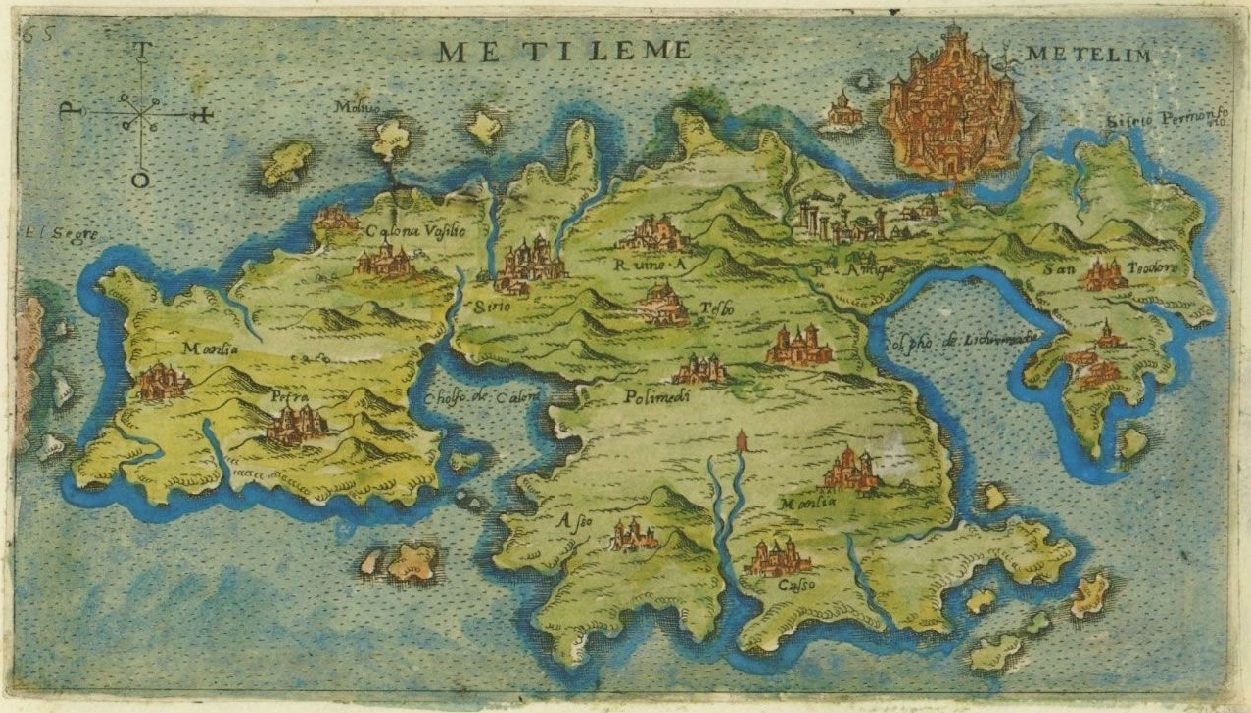
Map of Lesbos by Giacomo Franco (1597)

After the Fall of Constantinople in 1453, the Gattilusi continued to rule Lesbos as tributary vassals to the Ottoman Empire, until the island was conquered by Sultan Mehmed II in September 1462. After the capture of Lesbos, the richer inhabitants were moved to Constantinople in order to repopulate the city, some boys and girls were taken away into imperial service, but the rest of the population remained. Mehmed II brought in Muslim settlers from Rumelia and Anatolia, and encouraged his Janissaries to settle there and take local wives. Among them was Yakub, the father of the pirate admiral Hayreddin Barbarossa. Named Midilli (مدللى) after its capital, Mytilene, the island became a sanjak (province) of the Eyalet of Rumelia, and after 1534 of the Eyalet of the Archipelago. Mytilene and Molova (the Turkish name for Molyvos/Methymna) became seats of kadis. The cathedral of Mytilene was converted into a mosque. Otherwise, the organization of the local Orthodox church was not altered.

In 1464, as part of the First Ottoman–Venetian War, the Venetians under Orsato Giustiniani occupied the fort of Agios Theodoros, but failed to capture the rest of the island, and destroyed the castle upon their withdrawal. Another attack occurred in 1474, when the Venetians under Pietro Mocenigo raided the island. During the Second Ottoman–Venetian War, a Venetian-led fleet of 200 ships besieged Mytilene, but the attack was defeated by Şehzade Korkut. His father, Sultan Bayezid II, then reinforced the Castle of Mytilene with artillery bastions.

The large majority of the island's population remained Greek Christian, although there was a sizeable Muslim community, formed from both immigrants and converts; from 7.4% of households in 1488, it rose to a peak of 19.45% in 1831 before starting to decline in relative terms, reaching 14% in 1892. The Islamization process peaked between 1602 and 1644. The Muslims lived throughout the island. Relations between the two communities were generally good, and Lesbians were often bilingual in both Greek and Ottoman Turkish. During Ottoman rule, the compulsory devshirme system was implemented into the island, where the locals including Muslim landowners and the state representatives negotiated enlisting their teenagers into the Ottoman military by preventing some boys from being levied and sneaking others into the levied groups. For example, in the winter between 1603 and 1604, 105 boys were levied from the island, and Lesbos was the only island that the levy was implemented in this period.

Lesbos prospered from trade, and Mytilene was considered the busiest Ottoman port in the Aegean Sea. West European representatives are attested in the city already in 1700, acting as vice-consuls for the consulates in Smyrna. The island exported olives and olive oil, wheat, grapes, raisins and wine, figs, fish, dairy products, acorns, soap, leather and hides, pitch and livestock. Mytilene itself increased five-fold in population during the Ottoman period. A number of new mosques were erected in the city, and Hayreddin Barbarossa built a madrasa, dervish lodge, and imaret erected in his hometown. Many of the early Ottoman buildings, as well as the city walls, were destroyed in the earthquake of 1867. Mevlevi and Bektashi lodges are attested, since 1544 for the former, and since 1699 for the latter. Molyvos, which was the island's second city for most of the Ottoman period, also experienced growth, doubling in size; unlike Mytilene, the Muslim element came to predominate, and comprised over half the population by 1874. Mosques were built and fortifications were undertaken during the long Cretan War with Venice. But during the 19th century, the town declined rapidly in importance and number of inhabitants, a decline which continued to modern times. In the mid-18th century, the castle and settlement of Sigri were established to protect the western coast from pirate attacks.

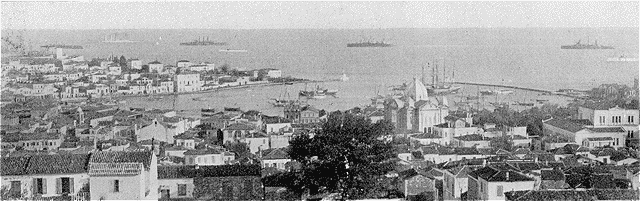
European warships off Mytilene during the 1905 incident.

The relative prosperity of the island—wealth was apparently concentrated among the Greek Christian bourgeoisie rather than the Muslim community—contributed to the island not taking part in the Greek War of Independence in 1821–1829. During the second half of the 19th century, this prosperity became evident in the construction of large and ornamented mansions and churches; the Muslims followed suit, employing the fashionable Neo-Classical and Neo-Gothic styles in their own renovations of their mosques, especially after the destructive 1867 earthquake. The Ottoman writer and liberal politician Namık Kemal served in the local administration in 1877–1884. In 1905, four European powers seized the customs and telegraph offices in the island to pressure the Ottoman government to accept their plan for an international commission that would supervise the provinces of Macedonia.

=== Modern era ===
In 1912, the First Balkan War broke out between the kingdoms of Greece, Bulgaria, Serbia and Montenegro, against the Ottoman Empire over the independence and expansion of Christian Balkan states. Under Rear Admiral Pavlos Kountouriotis, Greek naval forces landed at Lesbos on 21 November 1912, commencing the Battle of Lesbos. Kountouriotis sent an ultimatum to secure Mytilene under Greece, which Ottoman officials agreed to, before fleeing the city. The operation to annex the rest of the island was placed under Colonel Apollodoros Syrmakezis. Syrmakezis led 3,175 troops towards an Ottoman camp in Filia, reaching the outskirts of the city on 19 December, with an attack planned for the following morning. However, Ottoman military commanders approached Syrmakezis with a request for an armistice and Ottoman surrender was finalised on 21 December 1912, a month after the commencement of the battle. Nine Greek troops were killed and 81 were injured during the battle. The following year, the Ottoman Empire denied their previous agreement to cede Lesbos to Greece, until the Treaty of London.

In the Greco-Turkish population exchange that followed World War I and the Greco-Turkish War of 1919–1922, the local Muslims left the island and Lesbos returned to a fully Greek Christian population. In 1922, many Greek refugees from Asia Minor settled in Lesbos as a result of the war and the concurrent Greek genocide. These refugees were mostly women and children as the men were either fighting or had died in battle. A statue of a mother cradling her children named the "Statue of the Asia Minor Mother" was donated by the refugees and erected in Mytilene. Twenty years later, during World War II, Nazi Germany conducted an invasion of Greece and Yugoslavia, with both being defeated in 1941 and subsequently divided between the Axis powers. Lesbos was occupied by Germany until 10 September 1944, when Greece was liberated.

The poet Odysseus Elytis, the descendant of an old family of Lesbos, received the Nobel Prize in Literature in 1979.

== Tourism ==
The Roman Aqueduct at Mória

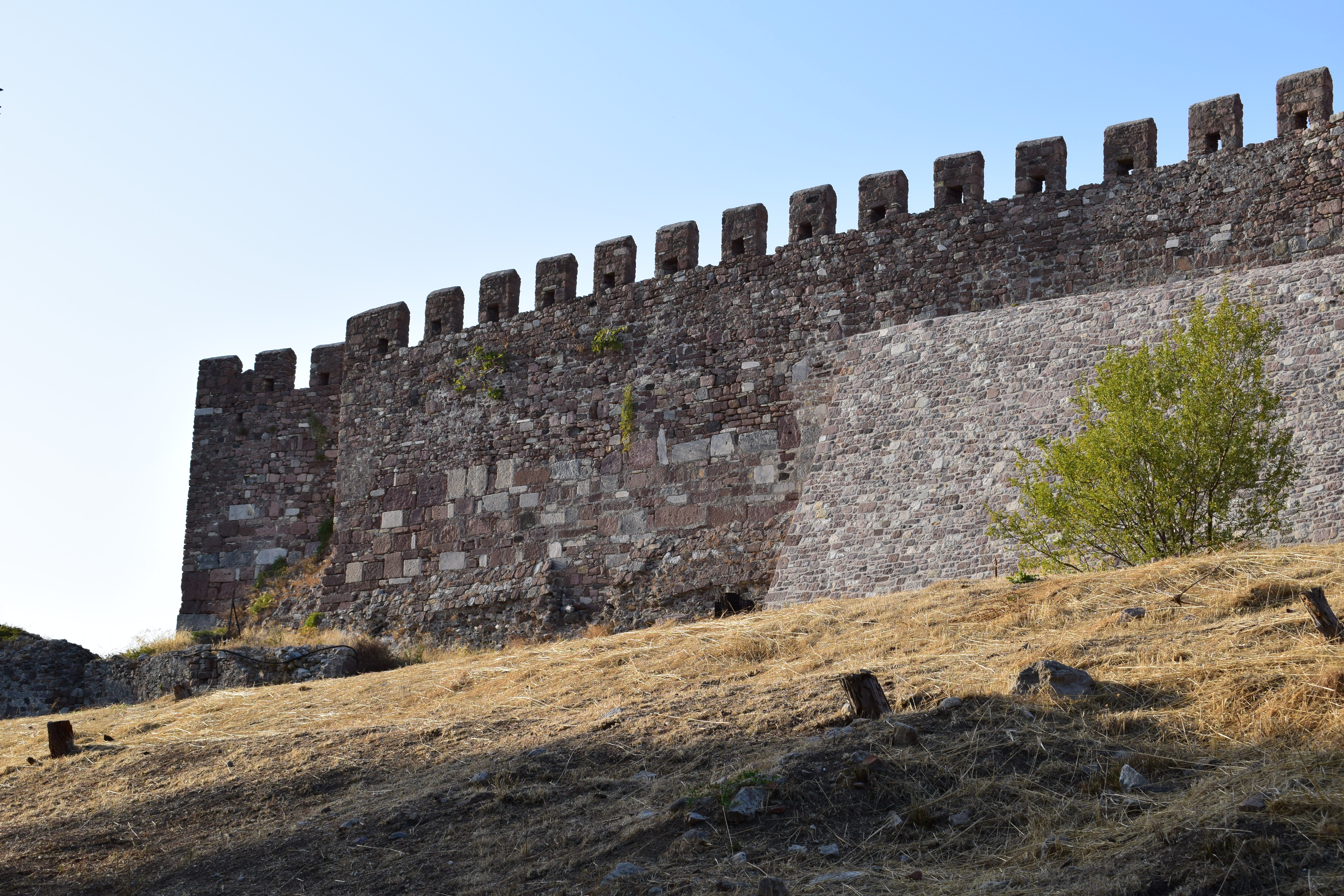
Castle of Mytilene

Lesbos is known to be one of the Greek island touristic hotspots, especially during its tourism season of April, May, June, and July. Mytilene airport management recorded 47,379 tourists visiting Lesbos in its 2015 tourism season. The refugee crisis has since slowed down tourism to the island, with a 67.89% decrease rate from June 2015 to June 2016. 6,841 Europeans on 47 flights arrived in Lesbos during its 2016 tourism season, compared to July the previous year, which saw 18,373 Europeans fly to the island on 130 flights. 94 cruise ships full of tourists arrived in Lesbos in 2011 and only one in 2018. Of the refugee crisis' impact on tourism, Maria Dimitriou, a local shop owner from Mithymna, said, "2015 was a very good year for tourism and then, suddenly they started to arrive. The refugees began arriving in mid-July, when the hotels were full of tourists. There were refugees everywhere, lying down with all their trash. And after this, tourism stopped."

In 2019, the head of the Lesbos chamber of commerce, Vangelis Mirsinias, told The Jakarta Post that the island's administration is trying to "woo back the tourists" and they "want to remind people of how beautiful" Lesbos is." He advocated for the European Union to help in advertising and also said, "The economy is still paying the impact of the crisis. It will need time and money to change this image." Lesbos is also a hotspot for Dutch tourists and one Dutch tourist said that tourism had halted because people "did not feel like seeing all this misery" of the refugees. One local told the publication that residents had become "fed up" and "people are angry towards the government and towards Europe: they told us not to worry, the camps won't last. But it's still there", whilst another business owner explained that he had lost a third of his business and "blames all the negative media attention" for the lack of tourists. The Jakarta Post also reported that tourists have increased in numbers in recent years, with 63,000 arriving in 2018. The COVID-19 pandemic has also damaged the island's tourism industry.

In April 2022, the Greek government announced a dedication of €2 million in restoring tourism in Lesbos and four other islands. In October 2022, it was announced that Lesbos would return to the cruise ship industry. Konstantinos Moutzouris, the governor of the North Aegean Region, which Lesbos is under, explained that the region's administration will run a study "in order to develop cruise tourism on the island." The deputy governor of tourism, Nikolaos Nyktas, believed that the cruise industry "suits the island and its culture", while the head of development for the project, Ioannis Bras, said that the island could "offer a lot to the cruise market".

In English and most other European languages, including Greek, the term lesbian is commonly used to refer to homosexual women. This use of the term derives from the poems of Sappho, who was born in Lesbos and who wrote with powerful emotional content directed toward other women. Due to this association, the town of Eresos, her birthplace, is visited frequently by LGBTQ tourists.

As of May 2027, Jet2 Airline will be flying from London Gatwick Airport directly to Lesbos Airport, with the new route to form part of Jet2's expansion of its Greek destinations.

== Land transport ==
There are two national roads in Lesbos: the EO36, a cross-island road from Mytilene to Kalloni; and the EO73, an east coast road from Thermi to Kratigos via Mytilene. The island is also served by 20 of 28 numbered provincial roads (the other eight being in Lemnos), created in 1956 while Lesbos was a prefecture: Eresos is accessible by provincial roads 14 or 15, via the EO36 from Kalloni.

== Geography ==
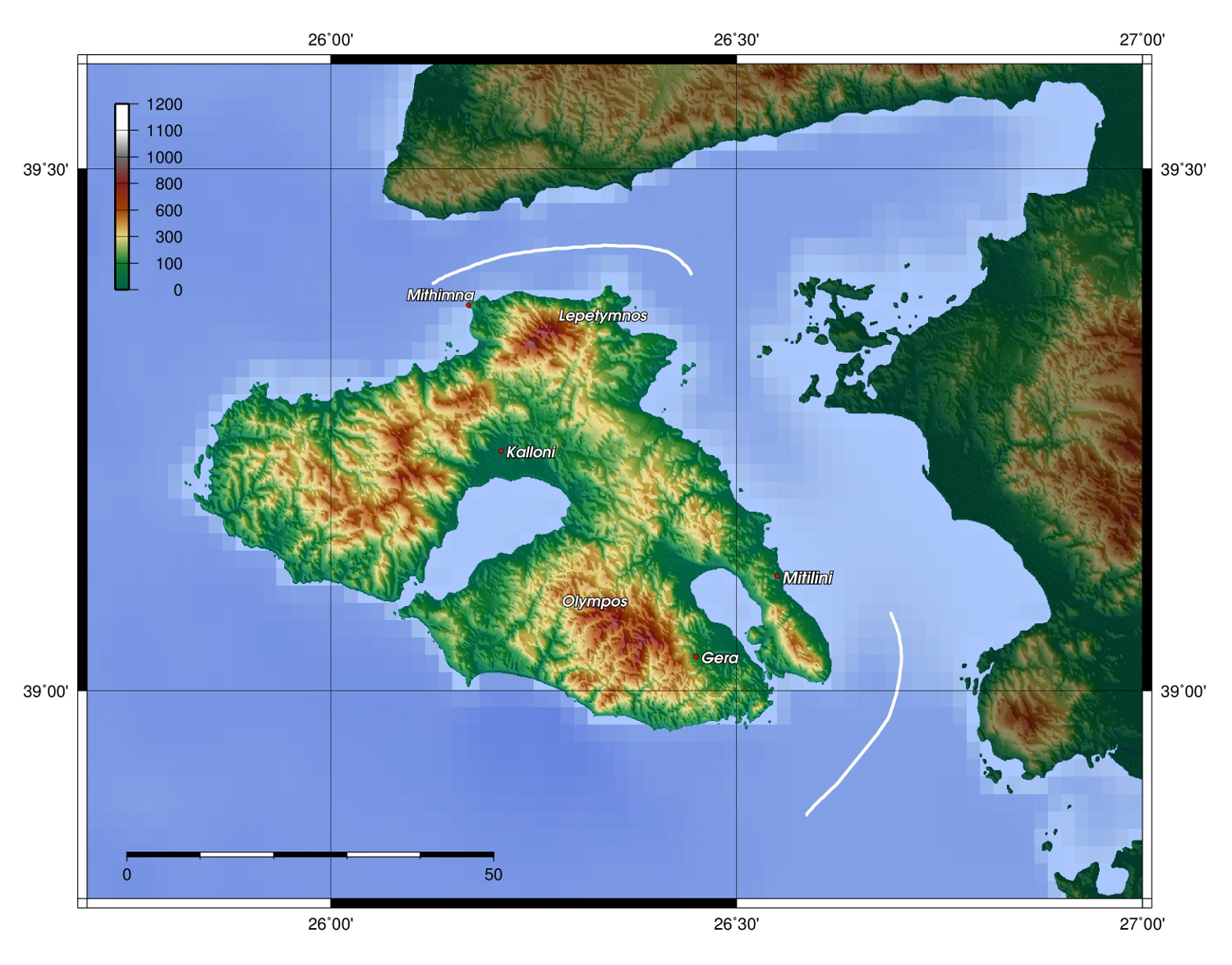
Topography of Lesbos

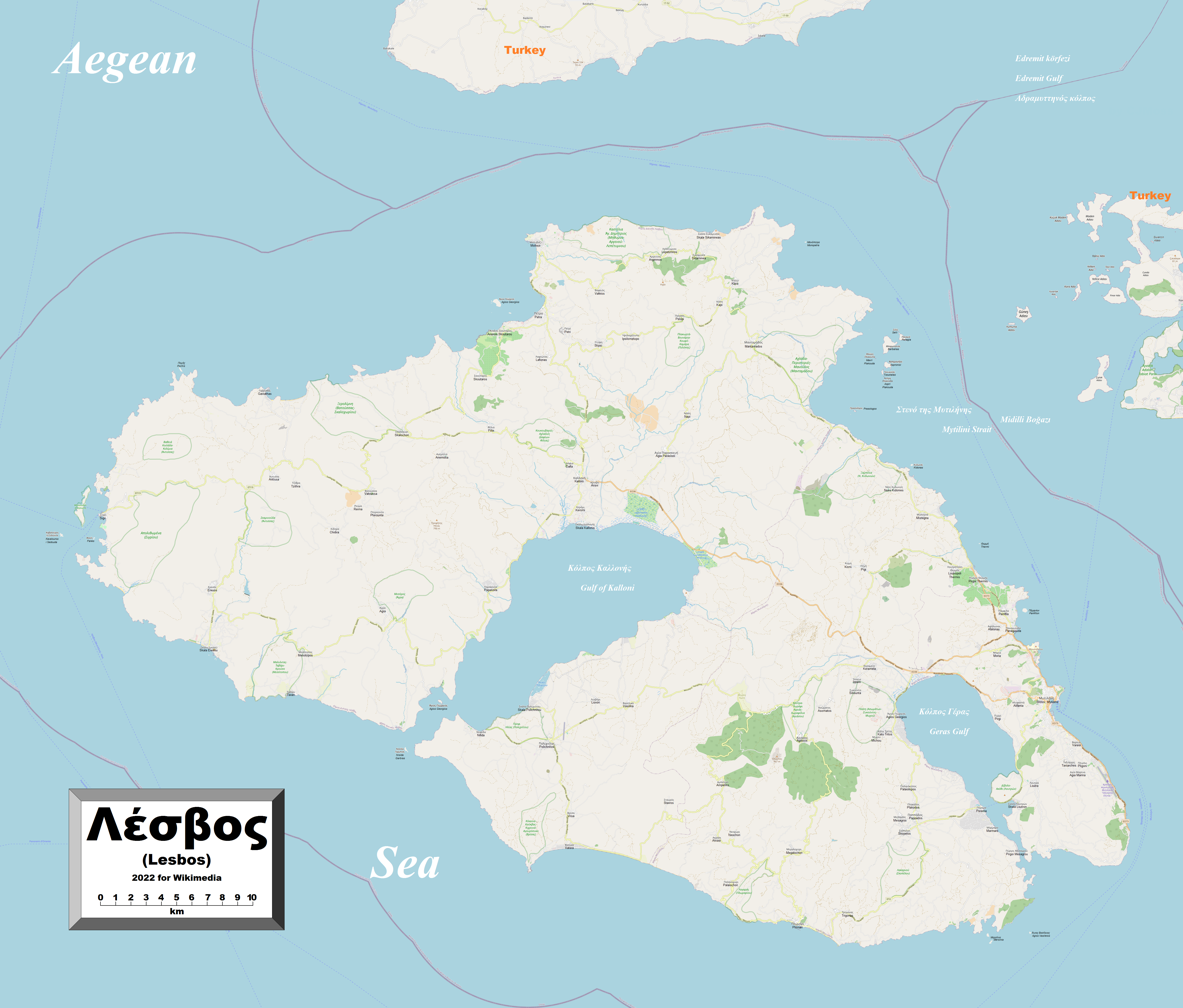
Detailed map of Lesbos

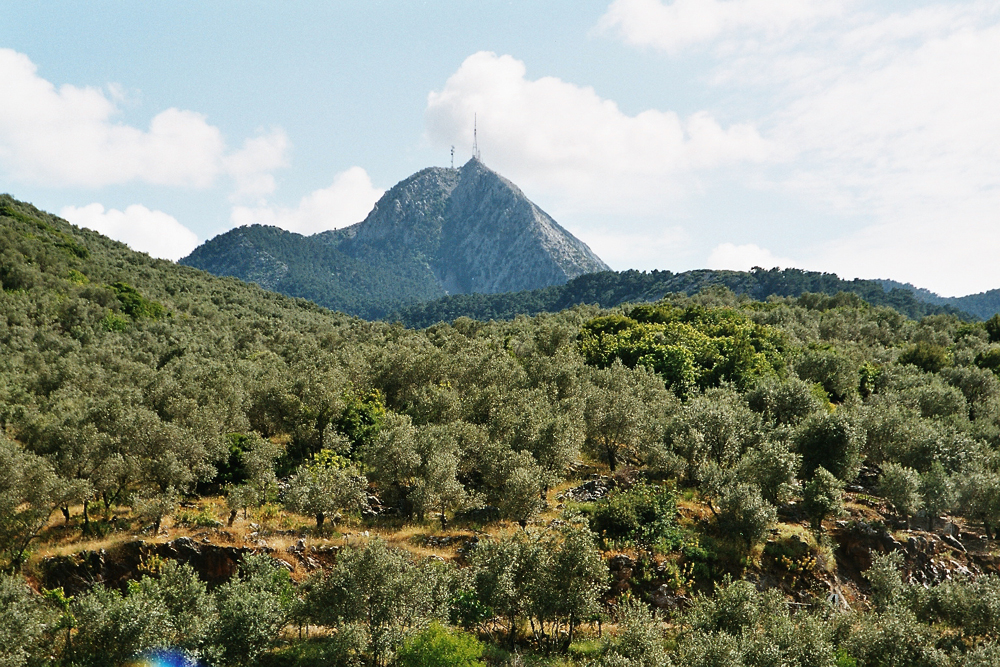
Mount Olympus’ peak rises 967 metres over Lesbos

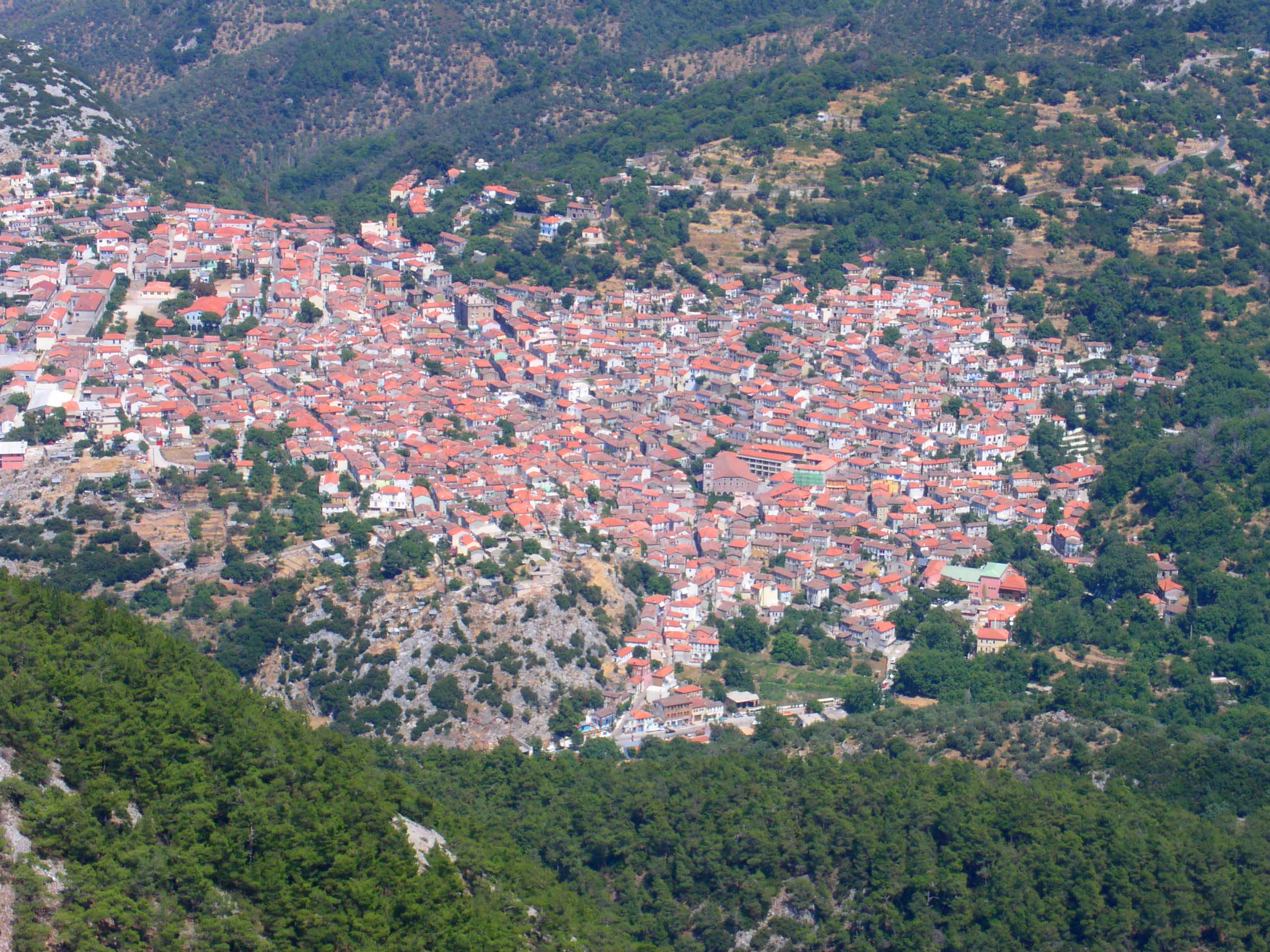
Agiasos village

Lesbos lies in the far east of the Aegean sea, facing the Turkish coast (Gulf of Edremit) from the north and east; at the narrowest point, the Mytilini Strait is about 5.5 km (3.4 mi) wide. In late Palaeolithic/Mesolithic times it was joined to the Anatolian mainland before the end of the Last Glacial Period. The shape of the island is roughly triangular, but it is deeply intruded by the gulfs of Kalloni, with an entry on the southern coast, and of Gera, in the southeast.

The island is forested and mountainous with two large peaks, Mount Lepetymnos at 968 m (3,176 ft) and Mount Olympus at 967 m (3,173 ft) (not to be confused with Mount Olympus in Thessaly on the Greek mainland), dominating its northern and central sections. The island's volcanic origin is manifested in several hot springs and the two gulfs. Lesbos is verdant, aptly named Emerald Island, with a greater variety of flora than expected for the island's size. Eleven million olive trees cover 40% of the island, together with other fruit trees. Forests of Mediterranean pines, chestnut trees and some oaks occupy 20%, and the remainder is scrub, grassland or urban. The island is also one of the best in the world for bird watching.

== Climate ==
The island has a hot-summer Mediterranean climate (Csa in the Köppen climate classification). The mean annual temperature is 18 °C (64 °F), and the mean annual rainfall is 750 mm (30 in). Its exceptional sunshine makes it one of the sunniest islands in the Aegean Sea. Snow and very low temperatures are rare.

Climate data for Mytilene (1955–2010 averages)
Month	Jan	Feb	Mar	Apr	May	Jun	Jul	Aug	Sep	Oct	Nov	Dec	Year
Record high °C (°F)	20.2 (68.4)	21.3 (70.3)	28.0 (82.4)	31.0 (87.8)	35.0 (95.0)	40.0 (104.0)	39.5 (103.1)	38.2 (100.8)	36.2 (97.2)	30.8 (87.4)	27.0 (80.6)	22.5 (72.5)	40.0 (104.0)
Mean daily maximum °C (°F)	12.2 (54.0)	12.8 (55.0)	15 (59)	19.3 (66.7)	24.3 (75.7)	28.9 (84.0)	31 (88)	30.8 (87.4)	27 (81)	22 (72)	17.4 (63.3)	13.9 (57.0)	20.9 (69.6)
Daily mean °C (°F)	9.5 (49.1)	9.9 (49.8)	11.6 (52.9)	15.6 (60.1)	20.2 (68.4)	24.7 (76.5)	26.6 (79.9)	26.1 (79.0)	22.9 (73.2)	18.5 (65.3)	14.3 (57.7)	11.3 (52.3)	17.6 (63.7)
Mean daily minimum °C (°F)	6.8 (44.2)	7.0 (44.6)	8.2 (46.8)	11.4 (52.5)	15.3 (59.5)	19.6 (67.3)	22 (72)	21.7 (71.1)	18.6 (65.5)	15 (59)	11.4 (52.5)	8.7 (47.7)	13.7 (56.7)
Record low °C (°F)	−4.4 (24.1)	−3 (27)	−1.2 (29.8)	4.0 (39.2)	8.4 (47.1)	11.0 (51.8)	15.8 (60.4)	16.3 (61.3)	10.9 (51.6)	5.2 (41.4)	1.4 (34.5)	−1.4 (29.5)	−4.4 (24.1)
Average precipitation mm (inches)	111 (4.4)	96.2 (3.79)	70.1 (2.76)	44.8 (1.76)	19.8 (0.78)	6.4 (0.25)	2 (0.1)	2.7 (0.11)	12.4 (0.49)	43.9 (1.73)	97.1 (3.82)	138.7 (5.46)	670.6 (26.40)
Average precipitation days (≥ 1.0 mm)	9.0	8.1	6.5	4.8	2.7	0.8	0.4	0.4	1.3	3.3	6.8	10.0	54.1
Average relative humidity (%)	71.0	69.8	57.5	63.9	62.6	57.3	56.0	57.4	59.5	66.1	71.0	72.0	64.5
Source 1: Hellenic National Meteorological Service
Source 2: NOAA

== Geology ==
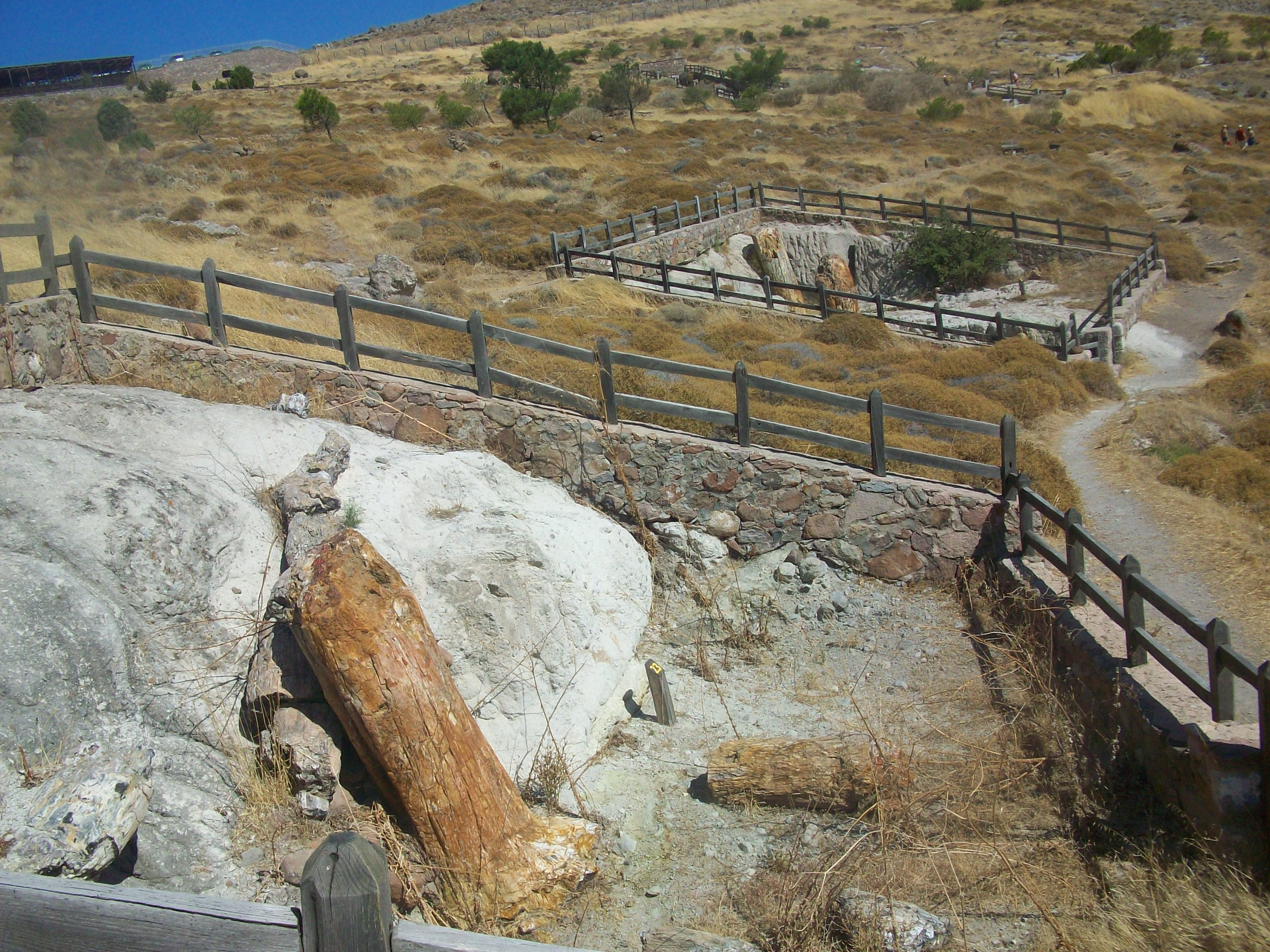
Petrified forest of Lesbos

The entire territory of Lesbos is "Lesvos Geopark", which is a member of the European Geoparks Network (since 2000) and Global Geoparks Network (since 2004) on account of its outstanding geological heritage, educational programs and projects, and promotion of geotourism.

This geopark was enlarged from former "Lesvos Petrified Forest Geopark". Lesbos contains one of the few known petrified forests, called the Petrified forest of Lesbos, and it has been declared a Protected Natural Monument. Fossilised plants have been found in many localities on the western parts of the island. The fossilised forest was formed during the Late Oligocene to Lower–Middle Miocene, as determined by the intense volcanic activity in the area. Neogene volcanic rocks dominate the central and western part of the island, comprising andesites, dacites and rhyolites, ignimbrite, pyroclastics, tuffs, and volcanic ash. The products of the volcanic activity covered the vegetation of the area and the fossilization process took place during favourable conditions. The fossilized plants are silicified remnants of a sub-tropical forest that existed on the northwest part of the island 20–15 million years ago.

== Landmarks ==
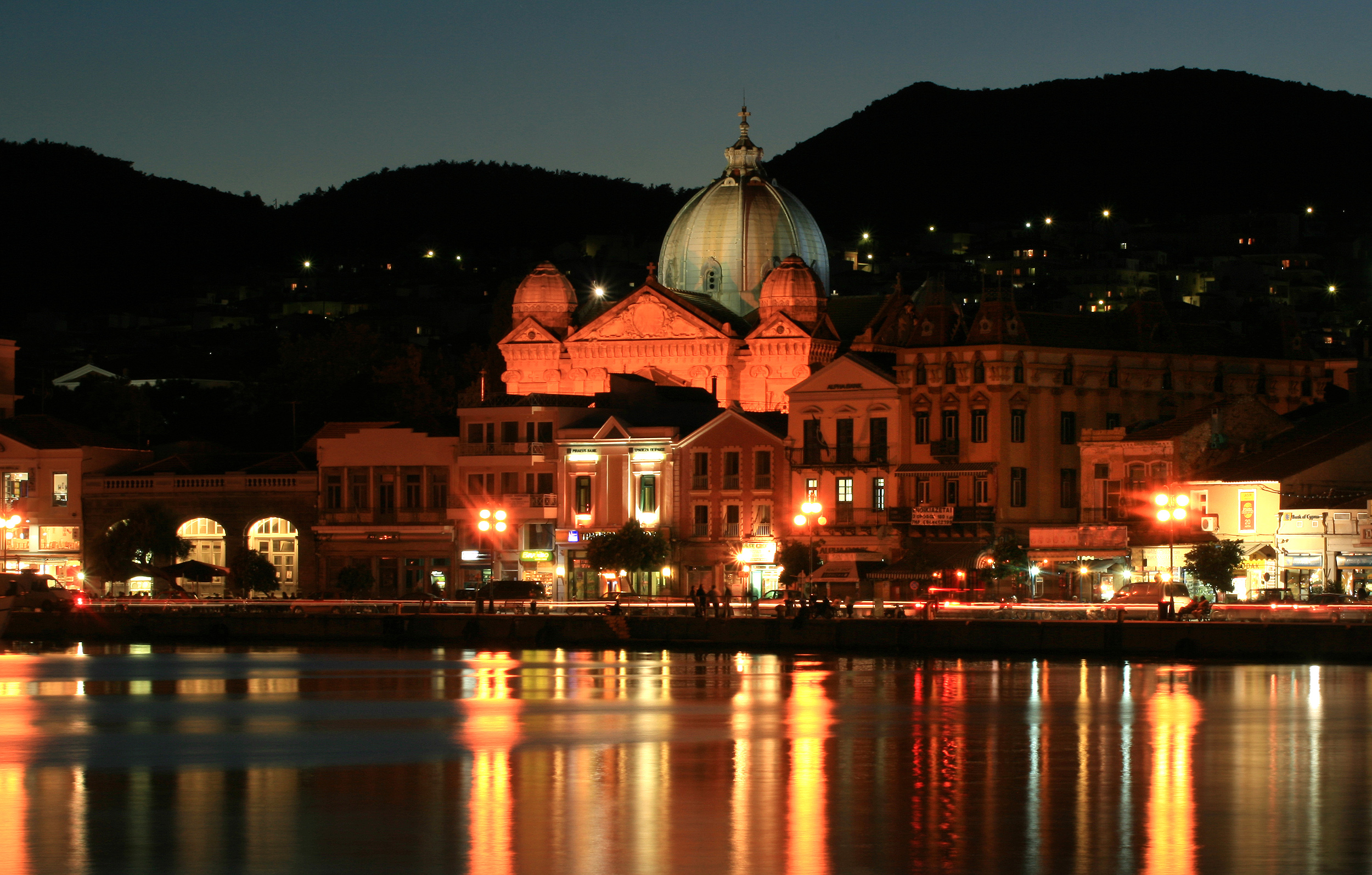
The church of Saint Therapon in Mytilene by night

- Petrified forest of Lesbos
- Catholic Church of Theotokos, where part of the relics of Saint Valentine are kept
- Castle of Molyvos (Mithymna)
- Castle of Mytilene
- Castle of Sigri
- Church of Panagia Agiasos
- Monastery of Agios Raphael
- Monastery of Taxiarchis
- Roman Aqueduct of Lesbos (Mória)
- The Bridge at Kremasti
- Early Christian Basilica of Agios Andreas in Eressos
- Temple of Klopedi
- Christian Temple of Chalinados
- Ancient Sanctuary of Messa
- Acropolis of Ancient Pyrra
- Monastery of Ipsilou
- Monastery of Limonas
- Statue of Liberty (Mytilene)
- Ouzo Museum "The World of Ouzo" in Plomari
- Barbayannis Ouzo Museum (Plomari)
- The Mosque in Parakila
- Catacomb of Mary Magdalene
- Sourlangas Leather Factory
- Panagia Gorgona in Skala Sykaminea

== Endangered sites ==
Twelve historic churches on the island were listed together on the 2008 World Monuments Fund's Watch List of the 100 Most Endangered Sites in the world. The churches date from the Early Christian Period to the 19th century. Exposure to the elements, outmoded conservation methods, and increased tourism are all threats to the structures. The following are the 12 churches:

- Katholikon of Moni Perivolis
- Early Christian Basilica Agios Andreas Eressos
- Early Christian Basilica Afentelli Eressos
- Church of Agios Stephanos Mantamados
- Katholikon of Moni Taxiarchon Kato Tritos
- Katholikon of Moni Damandriou Polichnitos
- Metamorphosi Soteros Church in Papiana
- Church of Agios Georgios Anemotia
- Church of Agios Nikolaos Petra
- Monastery of Ipsilou
- Church of Agios Ioannis Kerami
- Church of Taxiarchon Vatousa

== Administration ==
Lesbos is a separate regional unit of the North Aegean region. Since 2019, it consists of two municipalities: Mytilene and West Lesbos. Between the 2011 Kallikratis government reform and 2019, there was one single municipality on the island: Lesbos, created out of the 13 former municipalities on the island. At the same reform, the regional unit Lesbos was created out of part of the former Lesbos Prefecture.

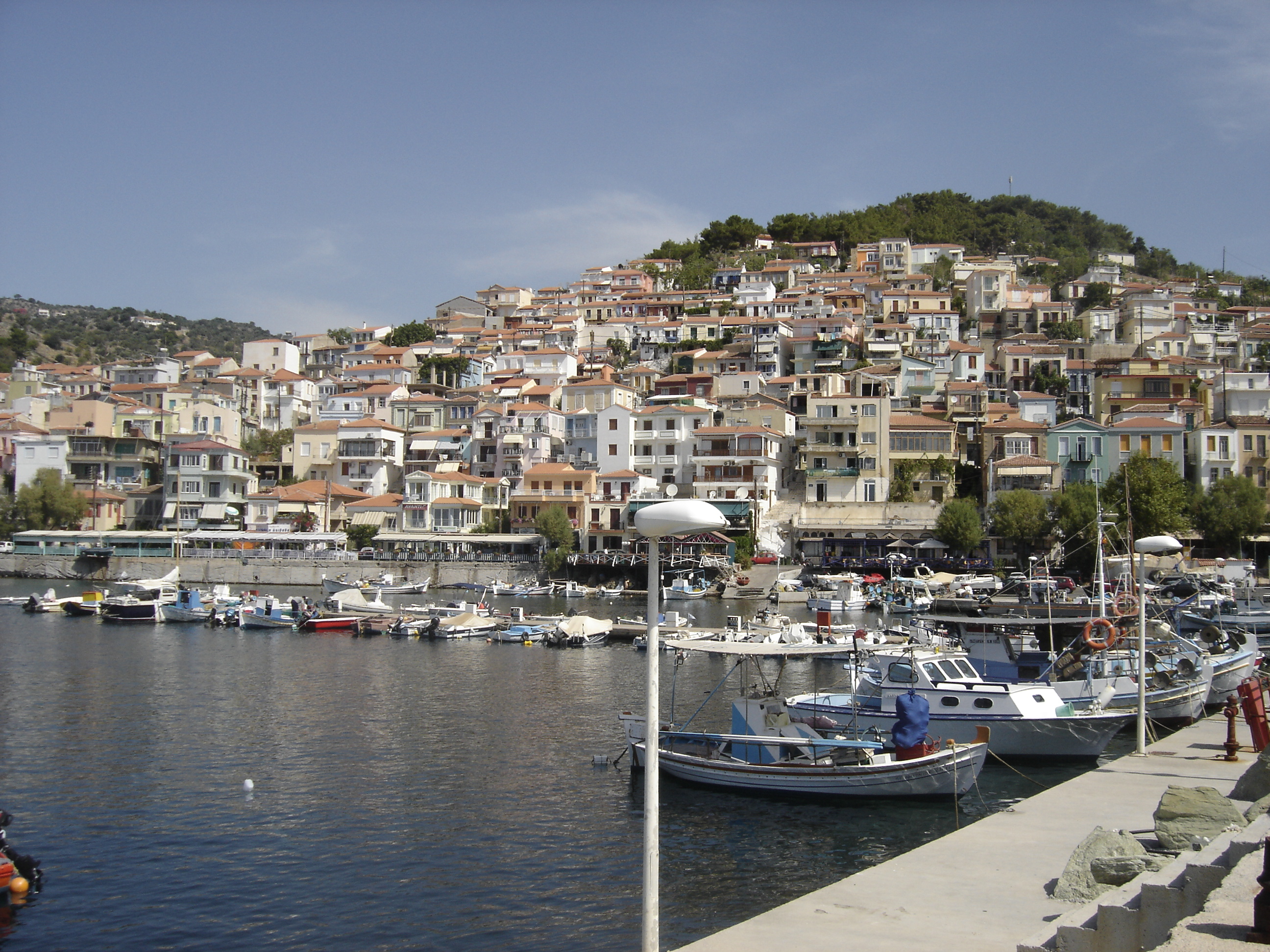
Plomari

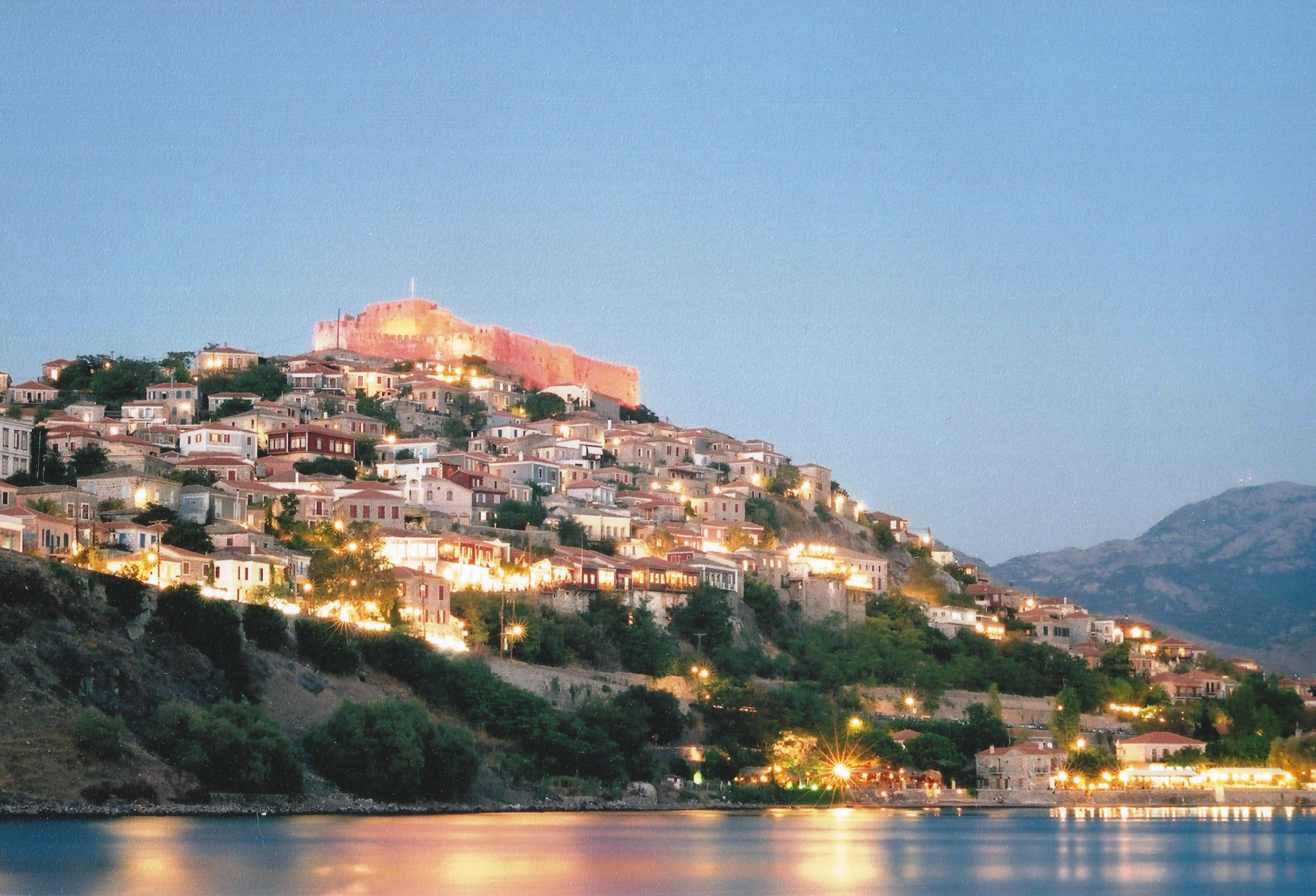
Mithymna

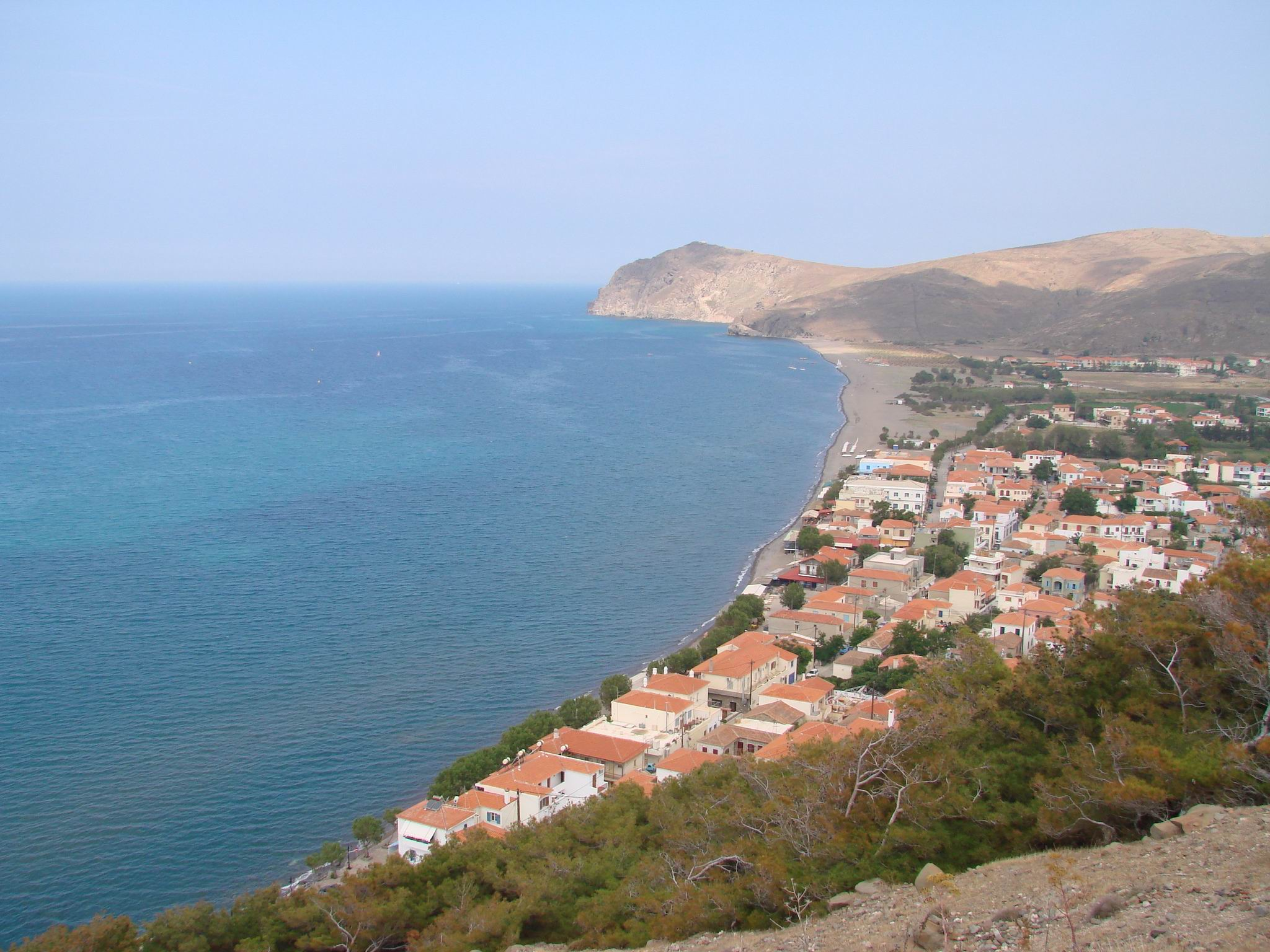
Skala of Eresos-Antissa

The municipality of Mytilene consists of the following municipal units (former municipalities):

- Agiasos (Αγιάσος)
- Evergetoulas (Ευεργέτουλας)
- Gera (Γέρα)
- Loutropoli Thermis (Λουτρόπολη Θερμής)
- Mytilene (Μυτιλήνη)
- Plomari (Πλωμάρι)

The municipality of West Lesbos consists of the following municipal units:

- Agia Paraskevi (Αγία Παρασκευή)
- Eresos-Antissa (Ερεσός-Άντισσα)
- Kalloni (Καλλονή)
- Mantamados (Μανταμάδος)
- Mithymna (Μήθυμνα)
- Petra (Πέτρα)
- Polichnitos (Πολίχνιτος)

== Economy ==
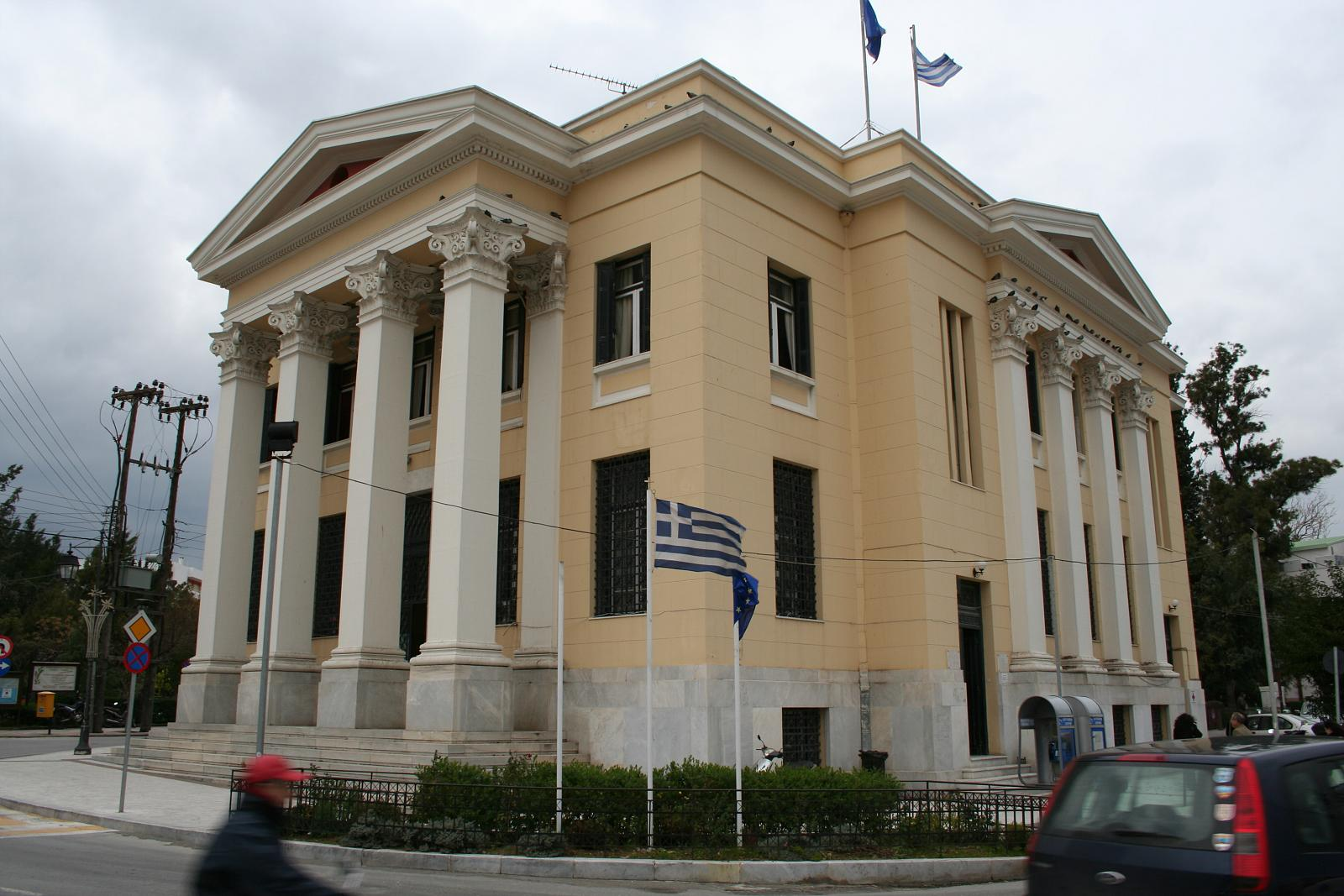
The building of the former Lesbos Prefecture, and now of the Lesbos Regional Unit

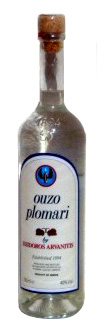
A bottle of Ouzo Plomari of Lesbos

The economy of Lesbos is essentially agricultural, with olive oil being the main source of income. Tourism in Mytilene, encouraged by its international airport and the coastal towns of Petra, Plomari, Molyvos and Eresos, contributes substantially to the island's economy. Fishing and the manufacture of soap and ouzo, the Greek national liqueur, are the remaining sources of income.

== Migrants ==
Due to its proximity to the Turkish mainland, Lesbos is one of the Greek islands most affected by the European migrant crisis that started in 2015. Refugees of the Syrian Civil War came to the island in multiple vessels every day. As of June 2018, 8,000 refugees were trapped when a deal between Europe and Turkey removed their route to the continent in 2016. After that, living conditions deteriorated and the possibility of movement to Europe dimmed. Moria Refugee Camp was the largest of the refugee camps and held twice as many people as it was designed to accommodate. By May 2020, Moria had 17,421 refugees living there.

On 9 September 2020, thousands of migrants fled from the overcrowded Moria camp after a fire broke out. At least 25 firefighters, with 10 engines, were battling the flames both inside and outside the facility. A smaller-scale facility, the Pikpa camp catered for a segment of the refugee population until its closure in October 2020, whereupon the occupants were transferred to the "old" Kara Tepe Refugee Camp.

The Greek government maintains that the fires were started deliberately by migrants protesting that the camp had been put in lockdown due to a COVID-19 outbreak amongst the migrants in the camp. On 16 September 2020, four Afghan men were formally charged with arson for allegedly starting the fire. Two other migrants, both aged 17, which is below the age of full adult criminal responsibility in Greece, were also allegedly involved in starting the fire, and were held in police detention on the mainland.

After the closure of the Moria camp, a temporary facility was rapidly set up at Kara Tepe. The Greek government announced in November 2020 that a new closed reception centre will be built in the Vastria area near Nees Kydonies, on the border between Mytilene and Western Lesbos, and will be completed by late 2021.

== Culture ==
=== Cuisine ===
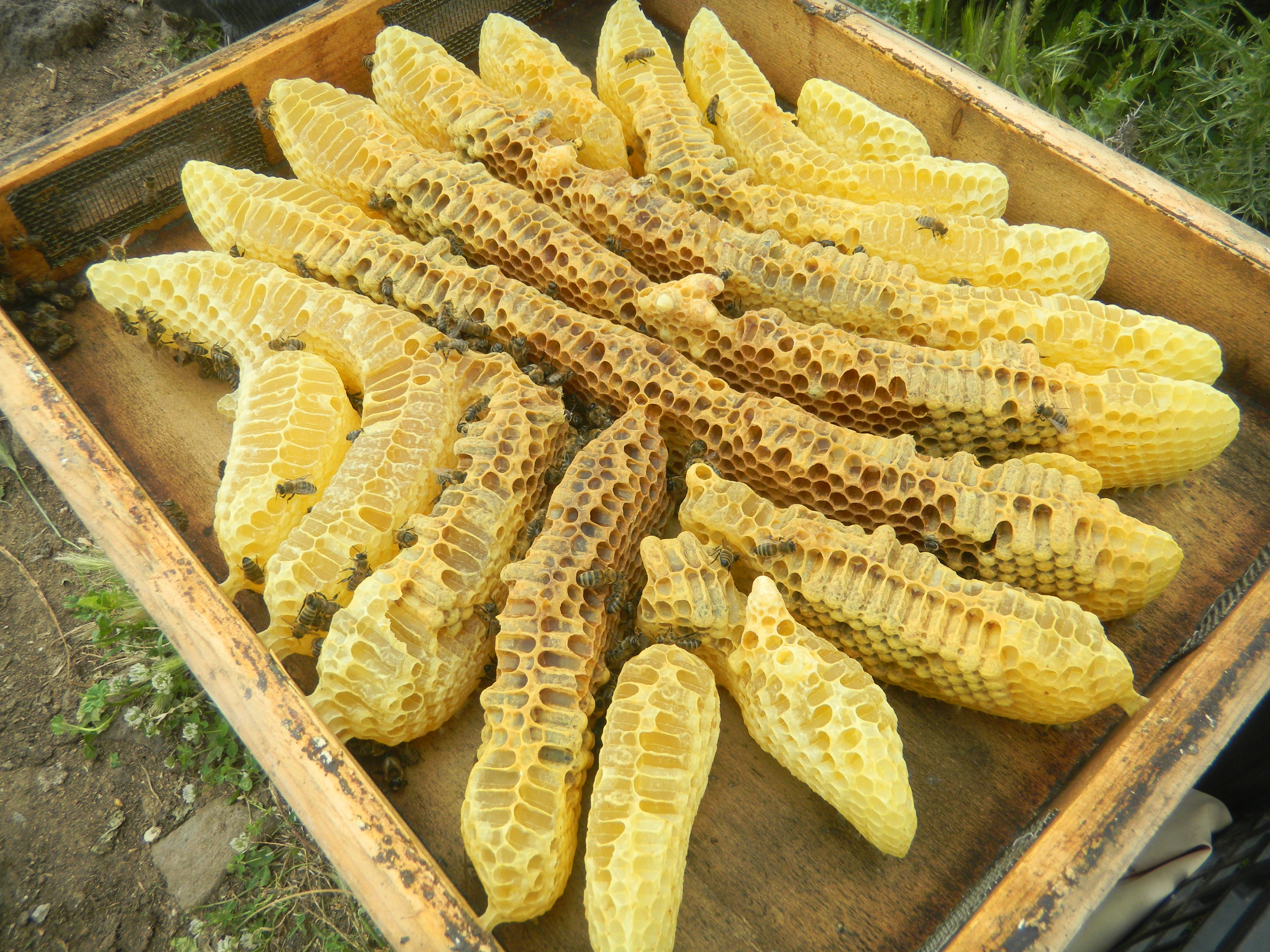
Honey from Lesbos

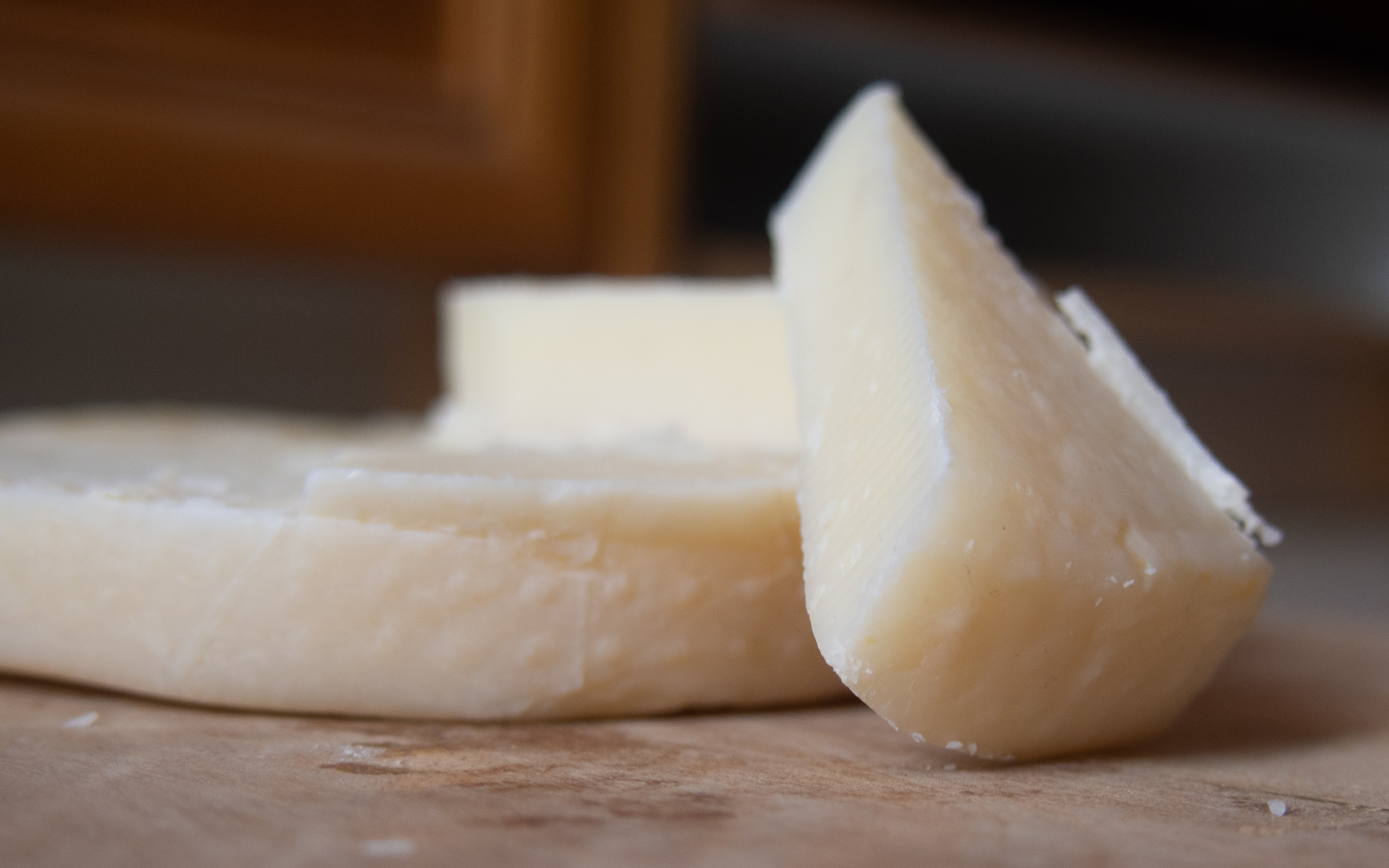
Ladotyri Mytilinis

Local specialties:

- Chachles, type of tarhana
- Kydonato, meat with quinces
- Revithato, meat with chickpeas
- Sardeles from Kalloni
- Ladotyri Mytilinis, cheese
- Selinato, meat with celery
- Sfougato, omelette
- Skafoudes, stuffed eggplants
- Sougania, stuffed onions
- Ouzo
- Platseda (dessert)
- Finikia (dessert)
- Amygdalota
- Retseli

=== In popular culture ===
- Films shot on the island include Daphnis and Chloe (1931) by Orestis Laskos, The tree under the sea (1985) by Philippe Muyl and One Love and the Other (1994) by Eva Bergman.
- Lesbos is depicted in Assassin's Creed Odyssey as the northeasternmost Aegean Island, the center of the island is where the player's character can encounter Medusa.

== Sports ==
The main football clubs in the island are Aiolikos, AIO Mytilini, AEL Kalloni, and Sappho Lesvou F.C.

== Media ==
=== Radio ===
Frequency	Name	On air since	Description
87.5 MHz	Radio Kalloni	1996	News, talk and Greek music
88.2 MHz	Love Mitilini	2003	Easy listening
90.0 MHz	Radio Mitilini	1989	Greek pop and rock music (formerly broadcast on 107.6)
91.6 MHz	Rythmos Radio	2005	Greek pop music
92.3 MHz	First Programme	1938	National; news and talk; first station of Greek state radio
92.8 MHz	Aeolos FM 92,8	1989	Greek laïko-rebetiko-éntekhno music
93.2 MHz	Astra FM 93,2	2000	Greek music
93.3 MHz	Foni tis Ecclesias	2000	Orthodox religious radio; rebroadcasting with Ecclesia FM 89,5
93.6 MHz	Intro Radio Lesvos	2021	Amateur radio with Greek pop music; located from Polichnitos
94.3 MHz	Second Programme	1952	National; Greek music; second station of Greek state radio
96.5 MHz	ERT Aegean	1989	News and talk; Local station of Greek state radio
96.8 MHz	Minore FM 96,8	1985	Greek music: Pop music and Dance music
97.2 MHz	Third Programme	1954	National; classical music; third station of Greek state radio
97.6 MHz	Local 9,72 Mitilini	1990	News, talk and music
98.6 MHz	Best FM Lesvos	1992	Greek and foreign music
99.0 MHz	Sto Nisi 99 FM	2019	News and talk
99.4 MHz	ERT Aegean	1989	News and talk; Local station of Greek state radio
99.8 MHz	SKAI Aegean	2009	News and talk
101.5 MHz	Slam 101.5	2019	Foreign music
103.0 MHz	ERT Aegean	1989	News and talk; Local station of Greek state radio
104.4 MHz	ERT Aegean	1989	News and talk; Local station of Greek state radio
104.8 MHz	Peiraiki Ecclesia	1988	Orthodox religious radio station by the Church of Piraeus
105.8 MHz	Peiraiki Ecclesia	1988	Orthodox religious radio station by the Church of Piraeus
105.9 MHz	ERT Aegean	1989	News and talk; Local station of Greek state radio
105.9 MHz	Second Programme	1952	National; Greek music; second station of Greek state radio
106.4 MHz	Third Programme	1954	National; classical music; third station of Greek state radio
106.9 MHz	SKAI Aegean	2009	News and talk
107.4 MHz	Peiraiki Ecclesia	1988	Orthodox religious radio station by the Church of Piraeus
107.7 MHz	Radio Kalloni	1996	News, talk and Greek music
107.9 MHz	ERA Sport	1993	National; sports and talk; fourth station of Greek state radio

=== TV ===
A regional television station operates from the city of Mytilene; Aeolos TV.

=== Newspapers ===
The main printed newspapers of the city are Empros, Ta Nea tis Lesvou, and Dimokratis. Online newspapers include Aeolos, Stonisi, Emprosnet, Lesvosnews, Lesvospost, and Kalloninews.

== Notable residents ==
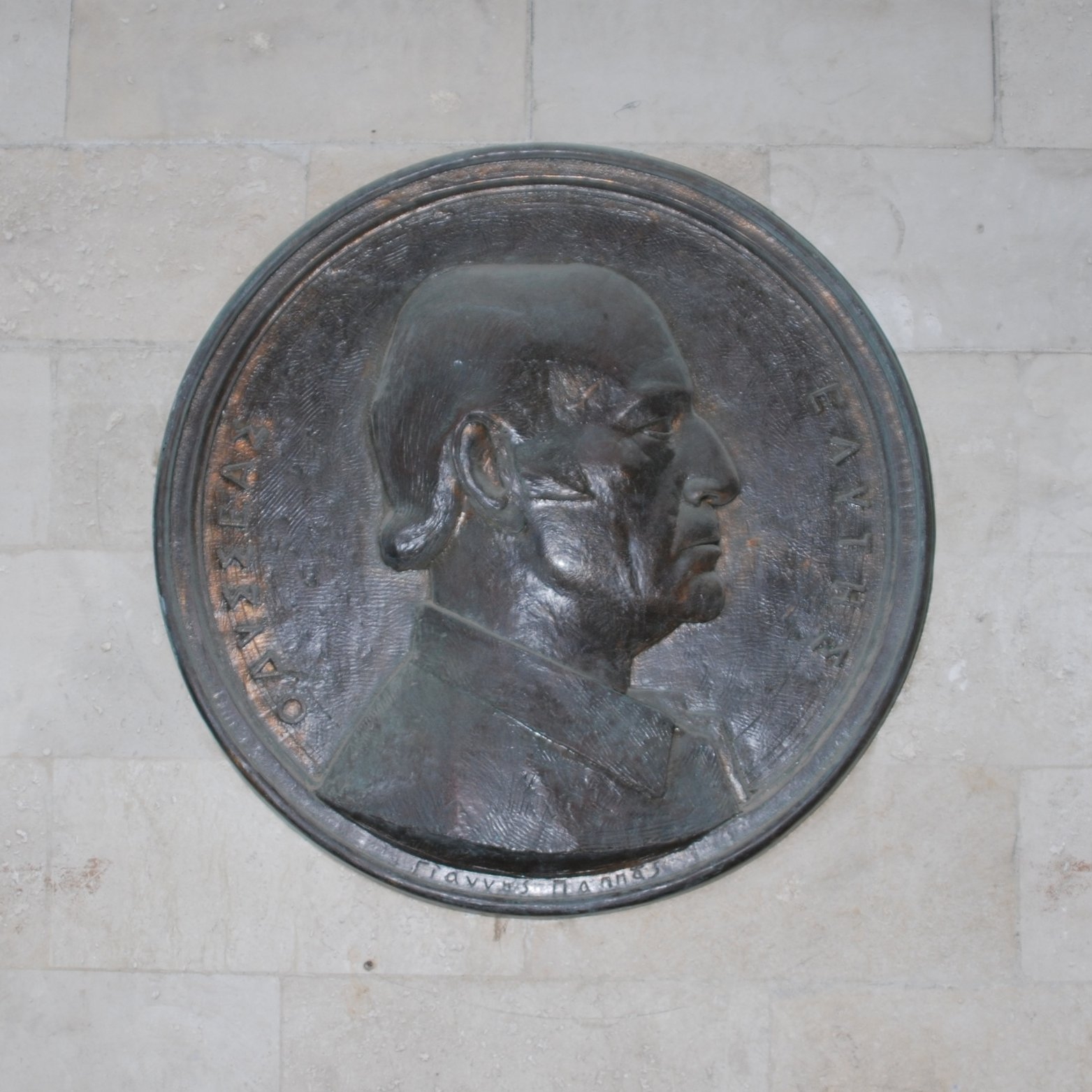
The Nobel Prize winner in Literature, poet Odysseas Elytis (Alepoudellis) was from Lesbos

- Lesches (8th or 7th century BC), early poet
- Sappho (7th and 6th centuries BC), poet
- Terpander (7th century BC), poet and citharede
- Alcaeus of Mytilene (7th century BC), poet and politician
- Arion (7th century BC), poet
- Hellanicus of Lesbos (5th century BC), historian
- Aristotle (384–322 BC), philosopher, was born in Chalkidike but lived for a time on the island.
- Laomedon of Mytilene (4th century BC), general of Alexander the Great
- Erigyius (4th century BC), officer in the army of Alexander the Great
- Theophrastus (370–285 BC), philosopher and botanist, successor to Aristotle
- Theophanes of Mytilene (1st century BC), ancient Greek historian
- Longus (2nd century AD), ancient Greek author
- Theoctiste of Lesbos (9th century), hermit saint
- Thomais of Lesbos (c. 909–947), lay woman saint
- Irene of Athens (c. 950–803), Byzantine empress regnant (797–802) was banished to Lesbos after being deposed
- Constantine IX Monomachos Byzantine emperor (1042–1055), resident of Mytilene prior to accession.
- Christopher of Mytilene (11th century), poet
- Alexios Philanthropenos (14th century), Byzantine general and governor of Lesvos
- Doukas (c. 1400 – after 1462), Byzantine historian
- Hayreddin Barbarossa (1470s–1546), Ottoman admiral
- Demetrios Bernardakis (1833–1907), dramatist
- Tamburi Ali Efendi (1836–1902), Turkish classical composer
- Gregorios Bernardakis (1848–1925), classical philologist and palaeographer
- Georgios Jakobides (1853–1932), painter
- Hüseyin Hilmi Pasha (1 April 1855 – 1922), Grand Vizier of the Ottoman Empire
- Theophilos Hatzimihail (c. 1870–1934), painter
- Ahmed Djemal (1872–1922), Ottoman commander, politician
- Georgios Emmanouil Kaldis (1875–1953) lawyer, journalist and politician
- Tériade (1889–1983), art critic, patron, and publisher
- Hermon di Giovanno (c. 1900–1968), painter
- Odysseas Elytis (1911–1996), poet, Nobel Prize in Literature 1979
- Stratis Myrivilis (1890–1969), writer
- Elias Venezis (1904–1973), writer
- Tzeli Hadjidimitriou (b. 1962), photographer and writer
- Kostas Kenteris (b. 1973), athlete (running, 200 meters), Gold Olympic medal Sydney 2000, World and European championship gold medal
- Alex Martinez, graffiti artist, illustrator, muralist
- Steffen Streich, ultra-endurance cyclist

== Gallery ==
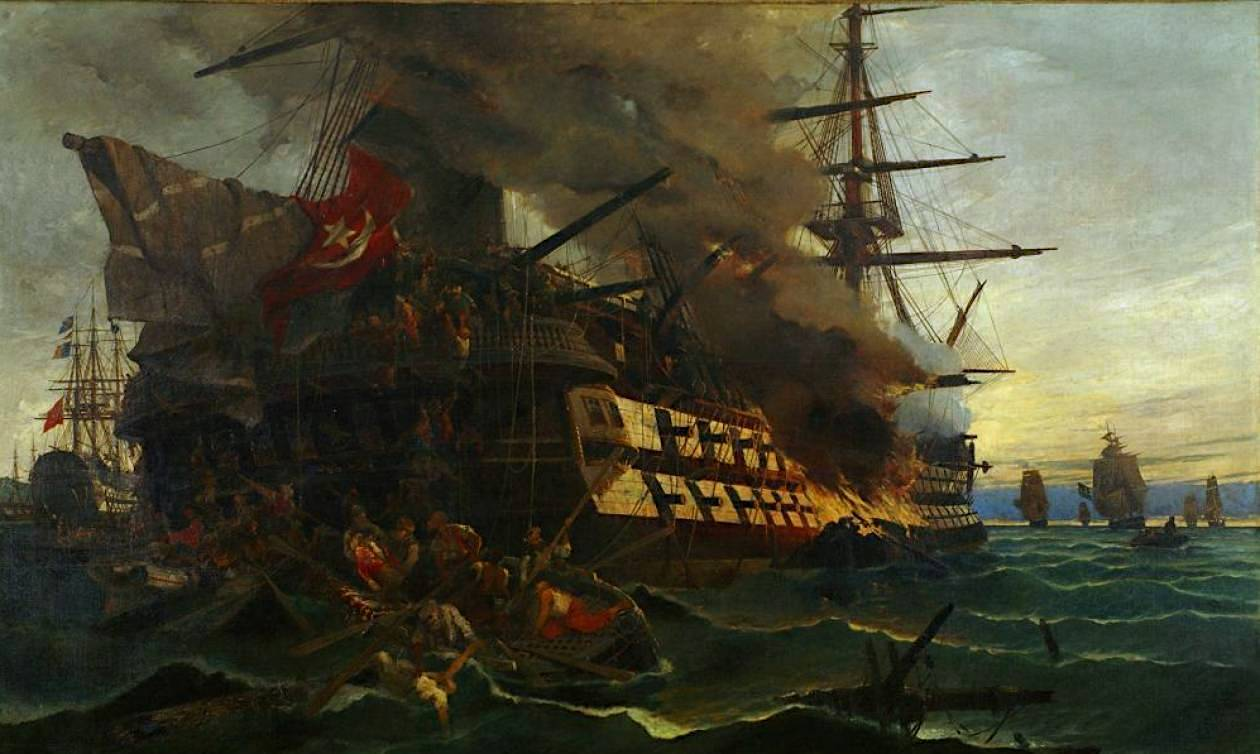
"The burning of the Ottoman frigate at Eresos by Dimitrios Papanikolis" by Konstantinos Volanakis

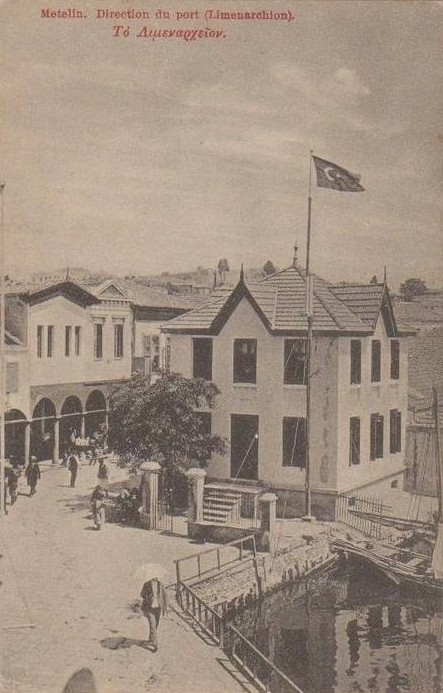
Ottoman flag in Mytilene in the last days of the Ottoman period

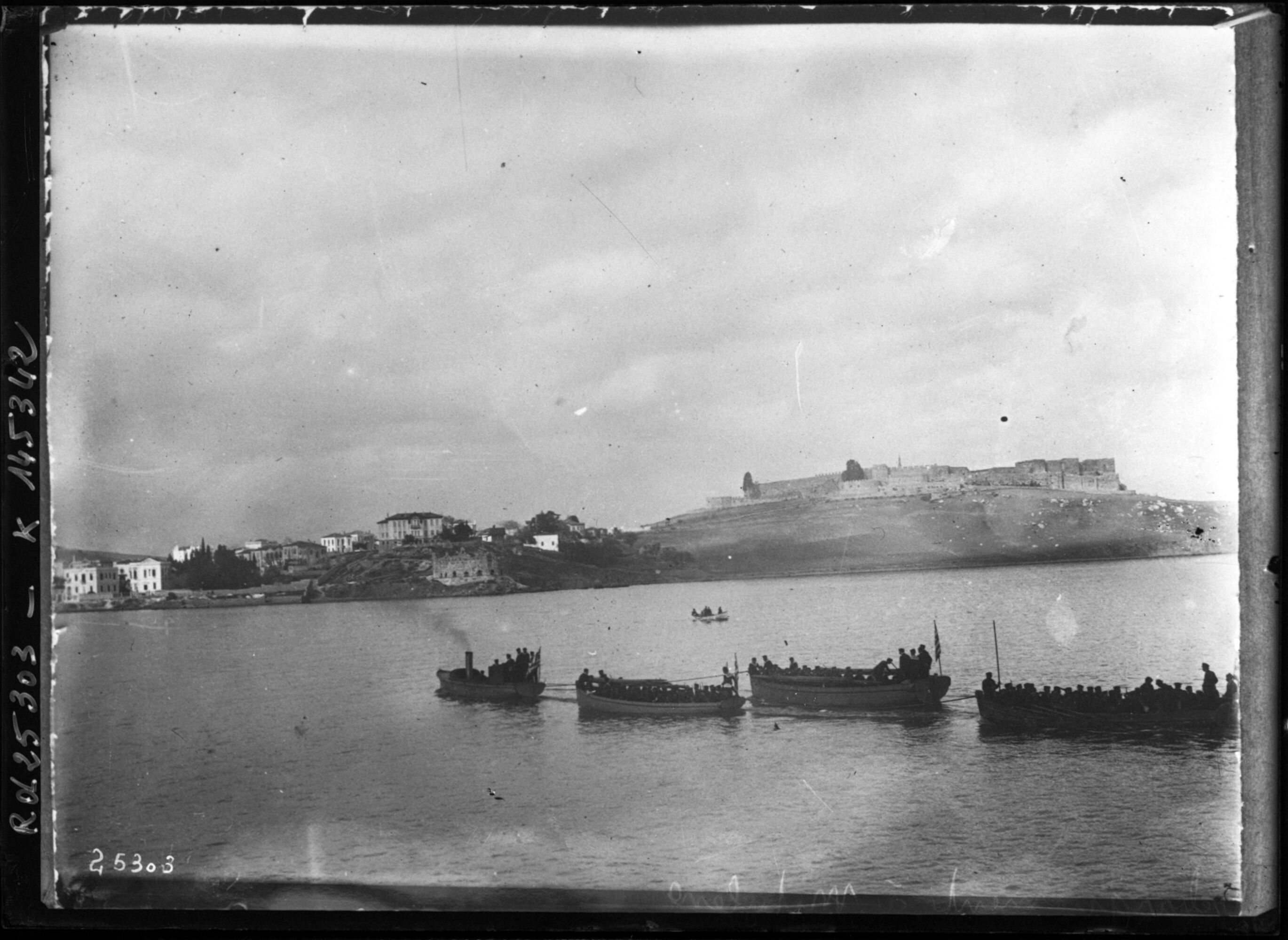
Greek troops land at Mytilene, 1912

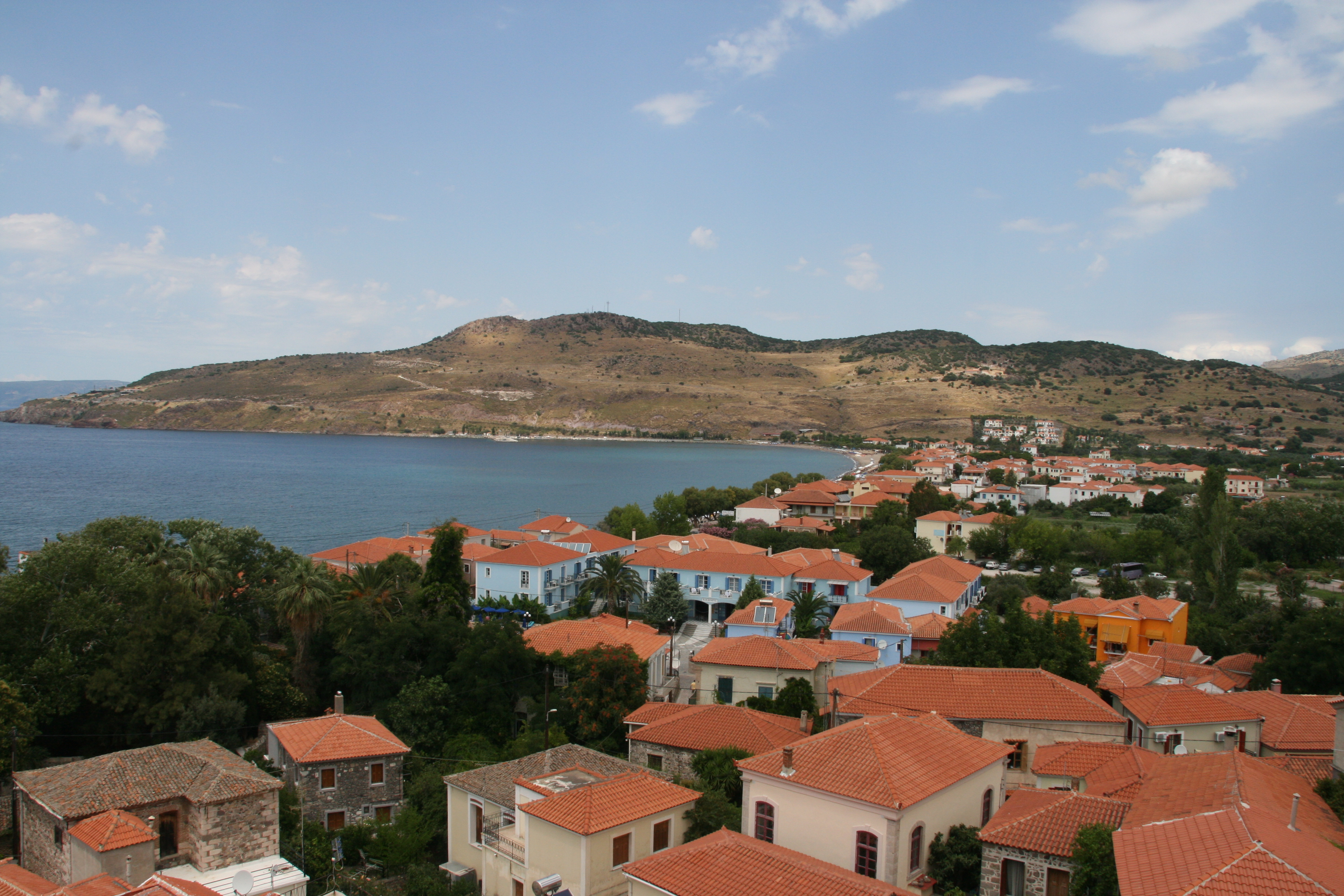
Petra, Lesbos

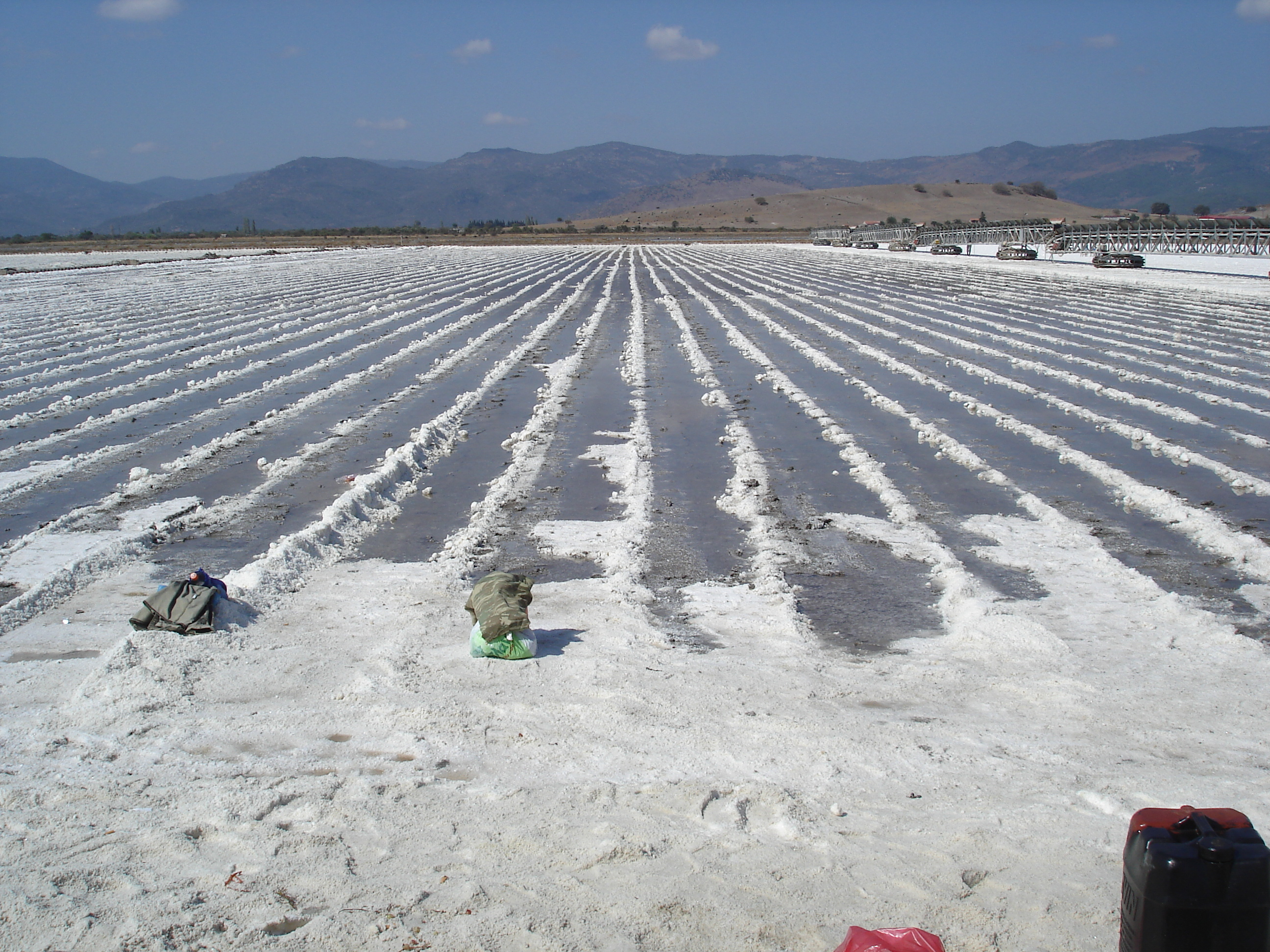
Extraction of the salt in Lesbos

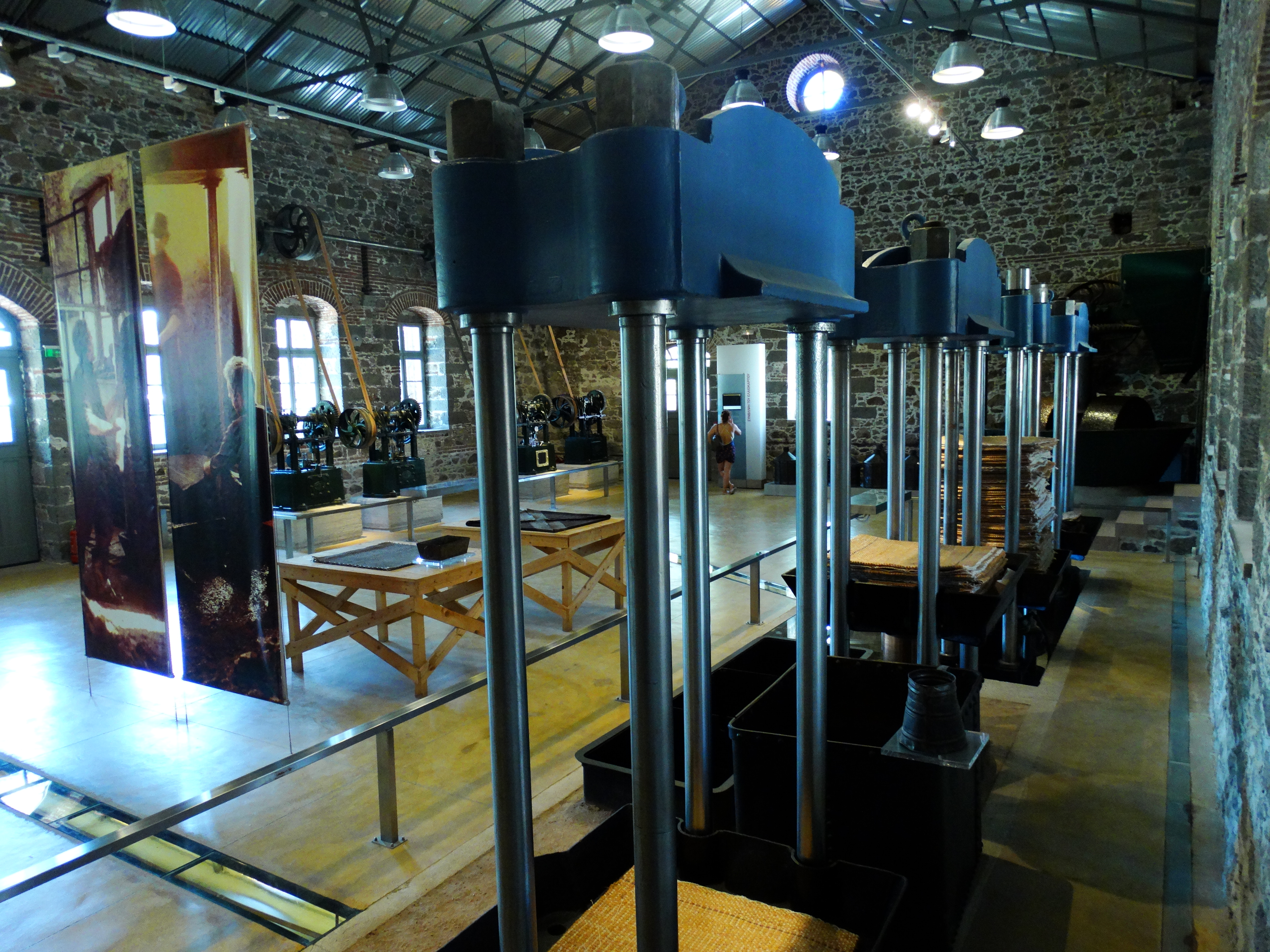
Museum of industrial olive oil production, Agia Paraskevi

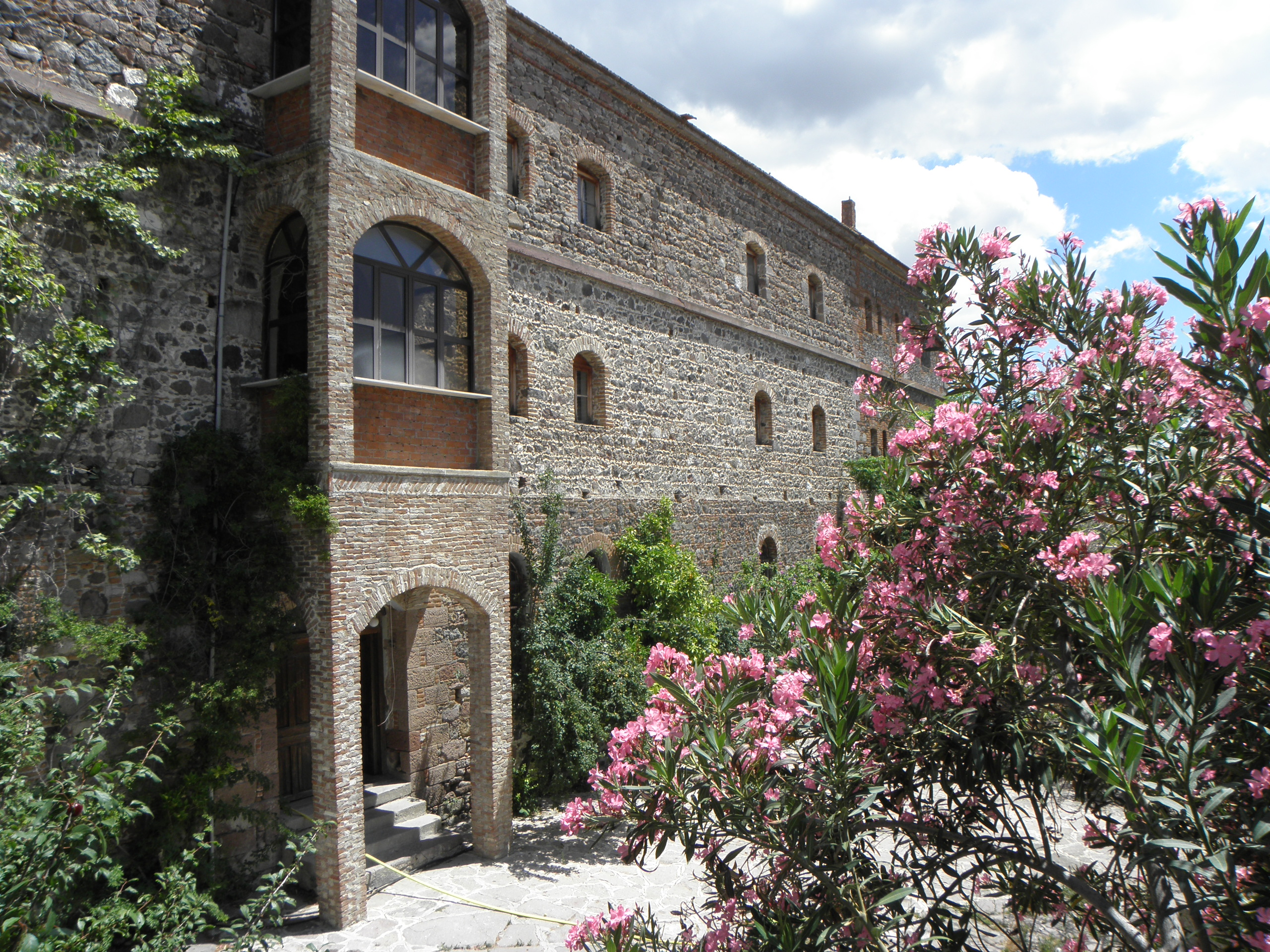
Limonas monastery

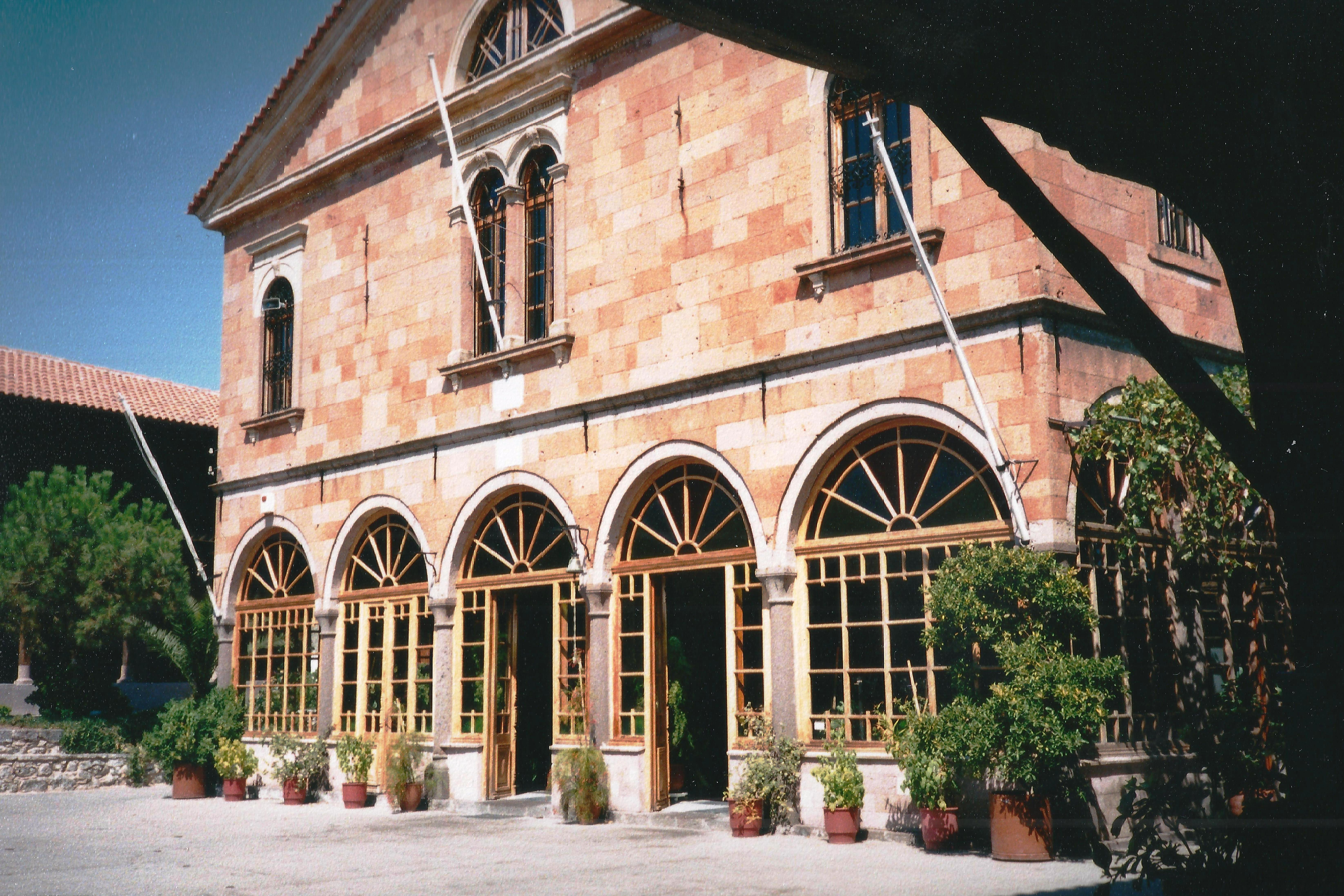
Taxiarchis Monastery

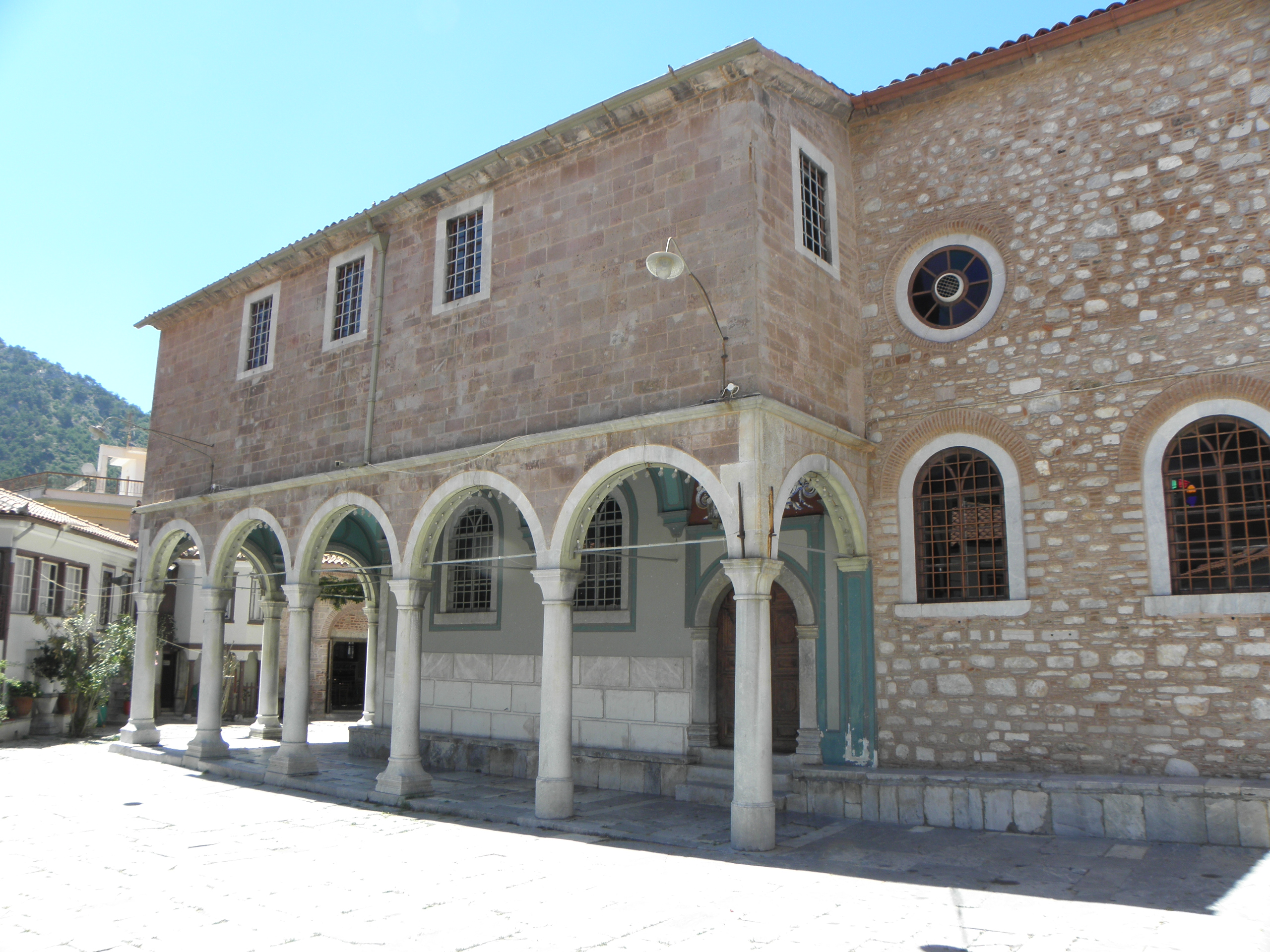
Panagia Church in Agiasos

== See also ==
- Adobogiona – an inscription in Lesbos honors this Celtic princess
- Assos
- Lesbian rule – historically a flexible lead mason's rule associated with Lesbos
- Lesbian wine
- List of islands of Greece
- List of traditional Greek place names
- University of the Aegean
- Ancient regions of Anatolia
