= Messon (Lesbos) =

Archaeological site in Greece

Coordinates: 39°11′47″N 26°18′19″E

Messon (Ancient Greek: Μέσσον) was a town of ancient Lesbos, containing a noted temple. The archaeological site is open to the public.

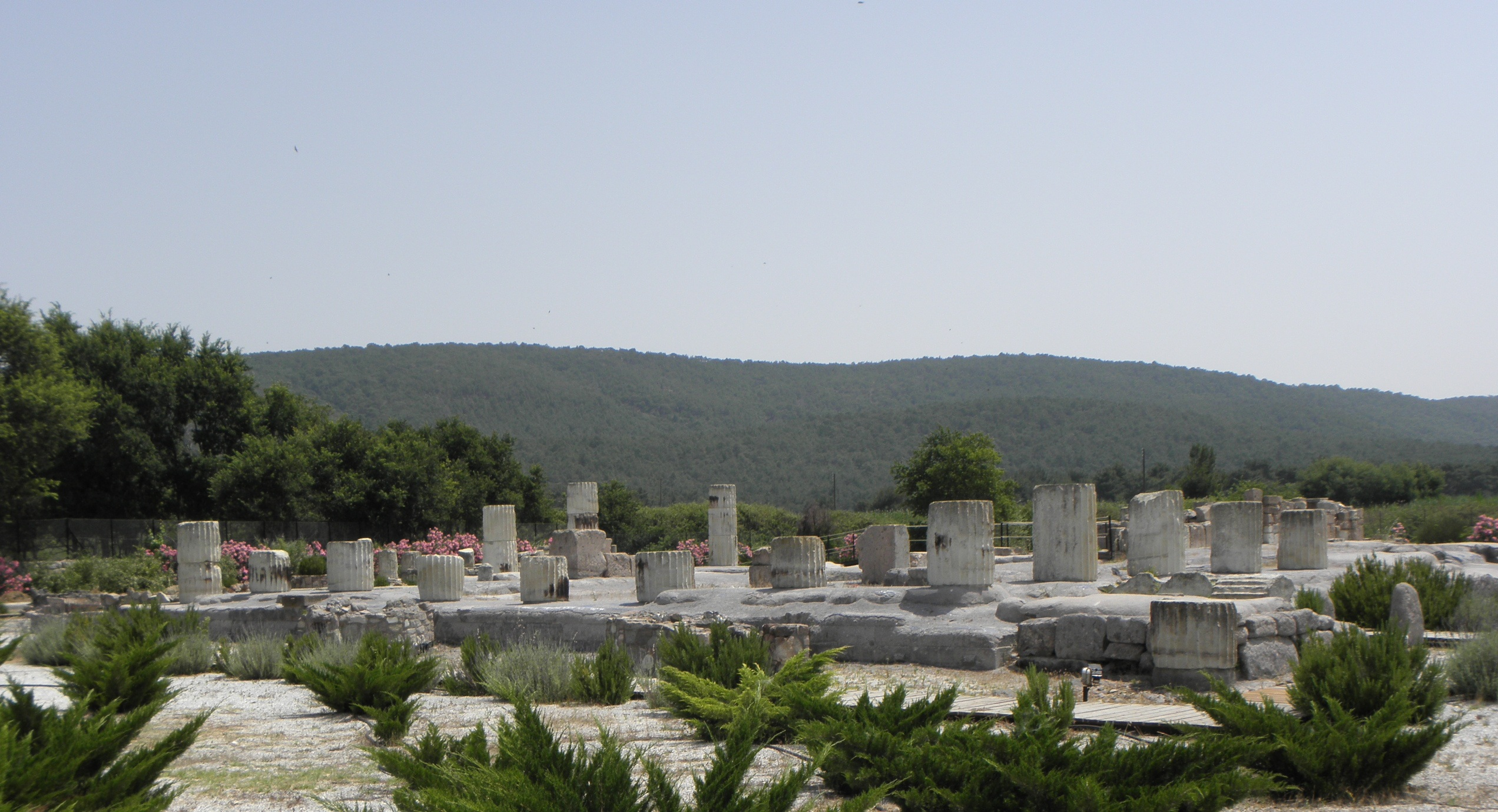
Archaeological site of Messa

The site of Messon is located near modern Messa.
