= Saint Therapon Church =

Church in Mytilene, Lesbos, Greece

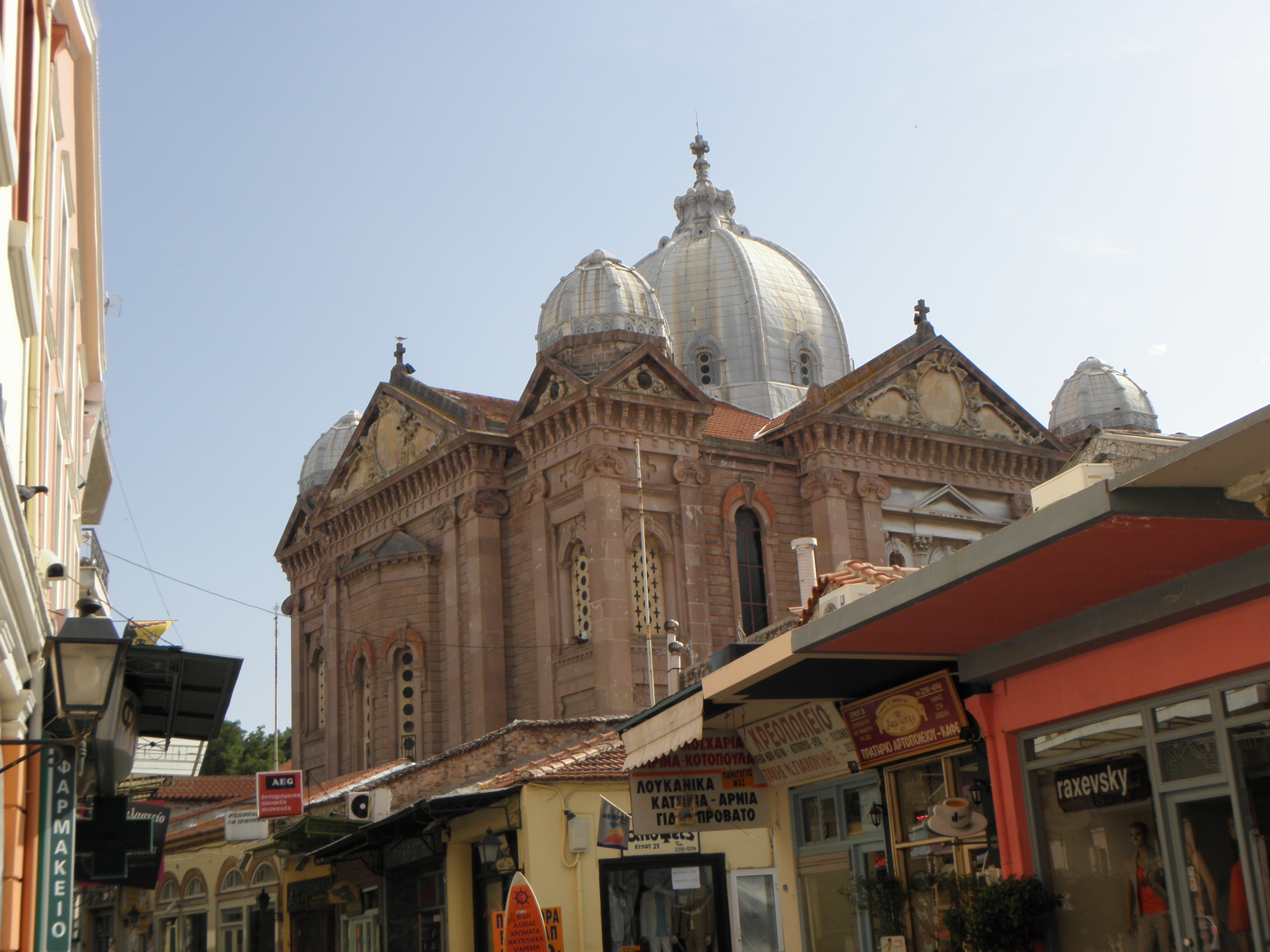
- The church in 2010

- Location of the church in Greece
- Saint Therapon Church
- 39°06′18″N 26°33′17″E
- Location: Mytilene, Lesbos, North Aegean
- Country: Greece
- Language: Greek
- Denomination: Greek Orthodox

History
- Status: Church
- Dedication: Saint Therapon

Architecture
- Functional status: Active
- Architect: Argyris Adalis
- Architectural type: Church
- Style: Eclecticism
- Groundbreaking: early 19th century
- Completed: 1935

The Saint Therapon Church is a Greek Orthodox church located in Mytilene, on the island of Lesbos, in the North Aegean region of Greece. The church is situated adjacent the town's port that is dedicated to Saint Therapon.

== Overview ==
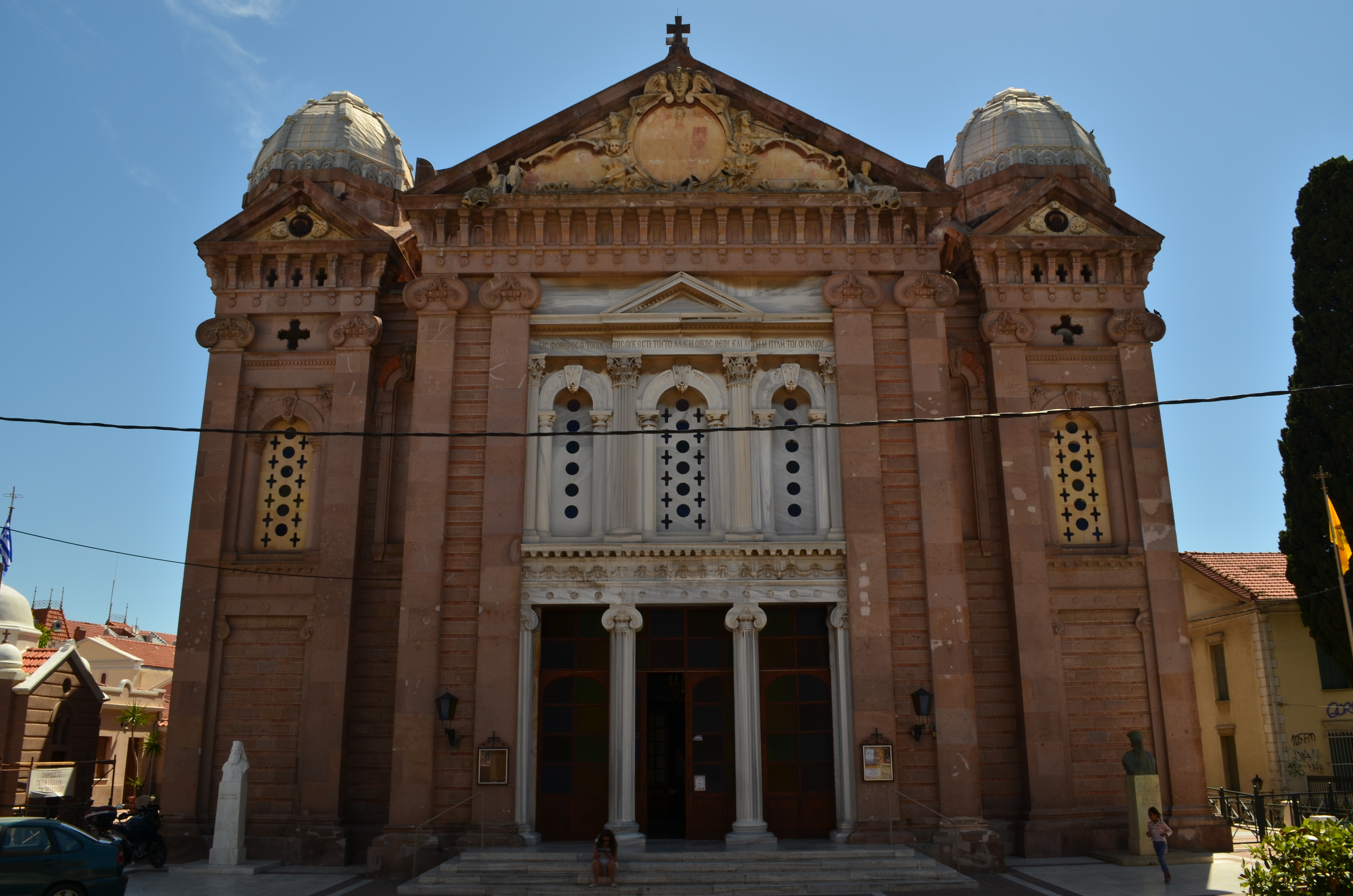
View of the church

The church was built in the beginning of the 19th century and was completed in 1935. The architect was the native of Lesbos, Argyris Adalis, a student of Ernst Ziller. The architectural order follows the cross-in-square type; however, the monument constitutes an eclectic combination of elements from contemporary architectural trends that prevailed in the Western Europe, including Baroque Revival, Rococo Revival, Neoclassic, and Gothic Revival elements, adding an impressiveness and a distinctive style to the monument.

== See also ==
- Church of Greece
- List of churches in Greece
