= Amygdalota =

Almond cookie from Greece

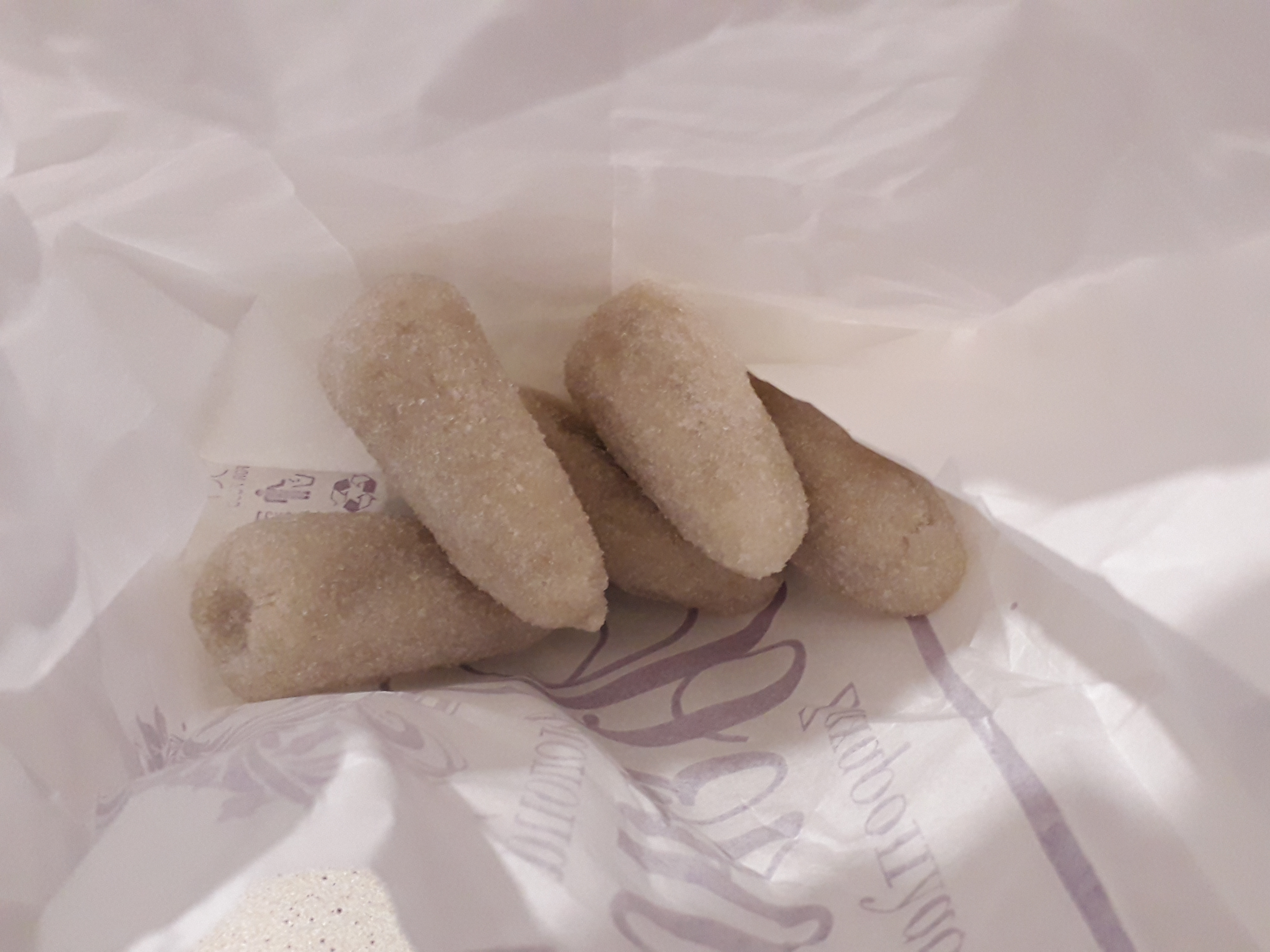
Amygdalota from Sifnos

Amygdalota (Greek: Αμυγδαλωτά; almond pears) are a type of almond cookie associated with the Cyclades. Although these cookies don't contain any coconut, they are sometimes called "Greek macaroons". They may be called rozethes, ergolavoi or troufes in some regions, and can be shaped like pears, or balls or other shapes. Whatever the shape, these cookies are usually made to be small enough to eat in one bite. They can be sweetened with honey and flavored with orange flower water or rose water. There are similar almond cookies found throughout the cuisines of the eastern Mediterranean region.
