= Protest =

Public act against political advantage

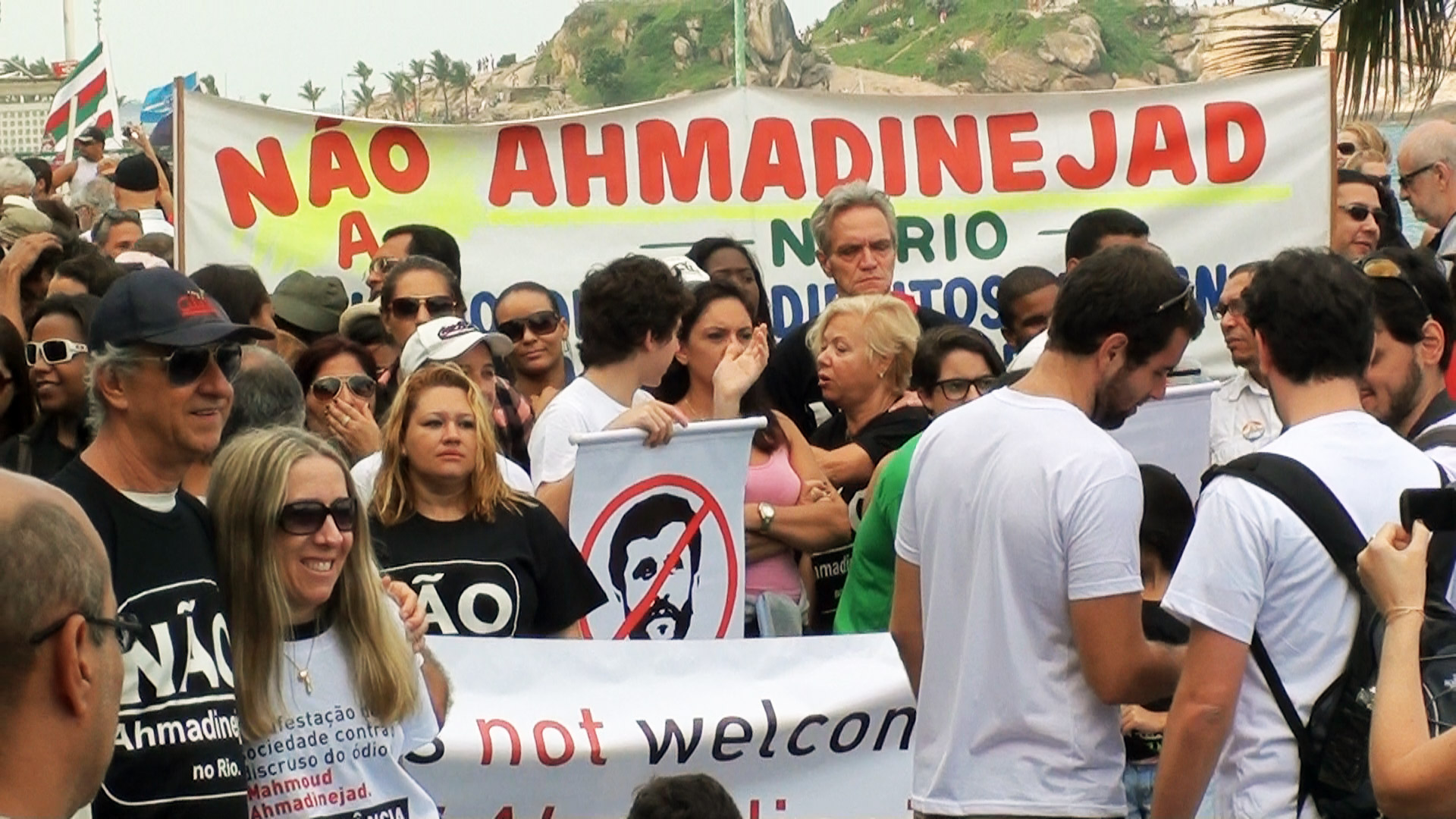
Demonstration against the president of Iran, Mahmoud Ahmadinejad, during the Rio+20 conference in Brazil, June 2012

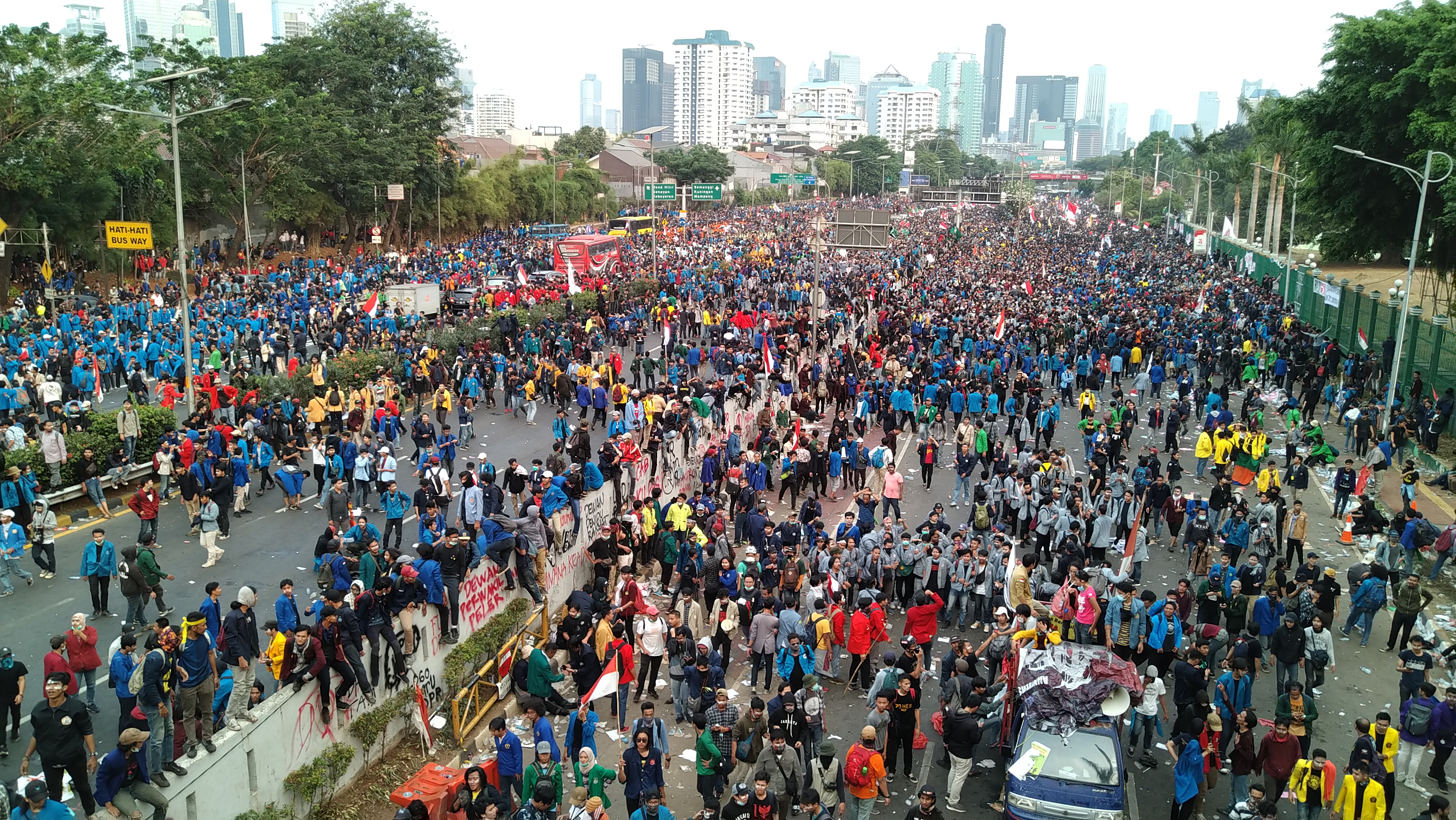
Demonstration in front of the MPR/DPR/DPD building in Jakarta during the 2019 Indonesian protests and riots

A protest (also called a demonstration, remonstration, or remonstrance) is a public act of objection, disapproval or dissent against political advantage. Protests can be thought of as acts of cooperation in which numerous people cooperate by attending, and share the potential costs and risks of doing so. Protests can take many different forms, from individual statements to mass political demonstrations. Protesters may organize a protest as a way of publicly making their opinions heard in an attempt to influence public opinion or government policy, or they may undertake direct action in an attempt to enact desired changes themselves. When protests are part of a systematic and peaceful nonviolent campaign to achieve a particular objective, and involve the use of pressure as well as persuasion, they go beyond mere protest and may be better described as civil resistance or nonviolent resistance.

Various forms of self-expression and protest are sometimes restricted by governmental policy (such as the requirement of protest permits), economic circumstances, religious orthodoxy, social structures, or media monopoly. One state reaction to protests is the use of riot police. Observers have noted an increased militarization of protest policing in many countries, with police deploying armored vehicles and snipers against protesters. When such restrictions occur, protests may assume the form of open civil disobedience, more subtle forms of resistance against the restrictions, or may spill over into other areas such as culture and emigration.

A protest itself may at times be the subject of a counter-protest. In such cases, counter-protesters demonstrate their support for the person, policy, action, etc. that is the subject of the original protest. Protesters and counter-protesters can sometimes violently clash. One study found that nonviolent activism during the civil rights movement in the United States tended to produce favorable media coverage and changes in public opinion focusing on the issues organizers were raising, but violent protests tended to generate unfavorable media coverage that generated public desire to restore law and order.

== Historical examples ==
Gandhi leading his followers on the famous Salt March to abolish the British Salt Laws

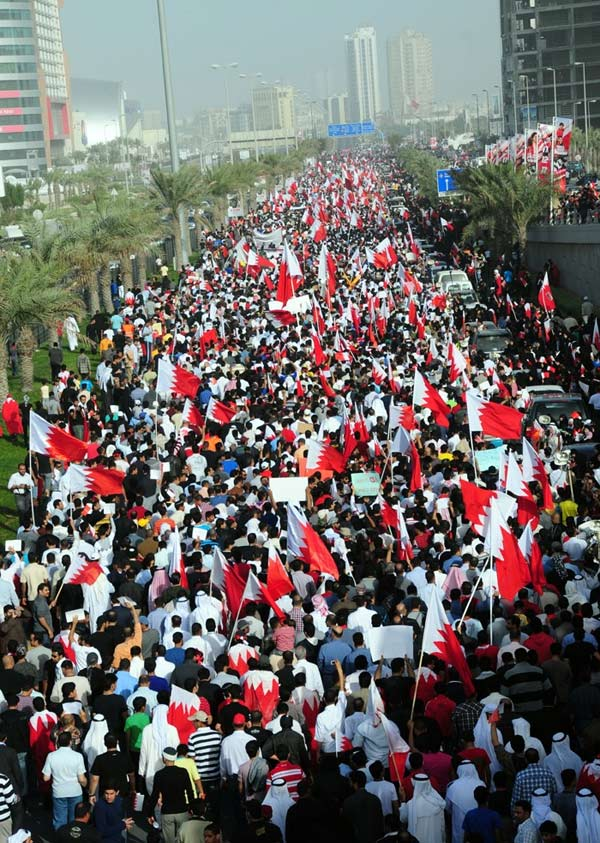
Protesters in the middle of the road in downtown Manama, Bahrain (2011)

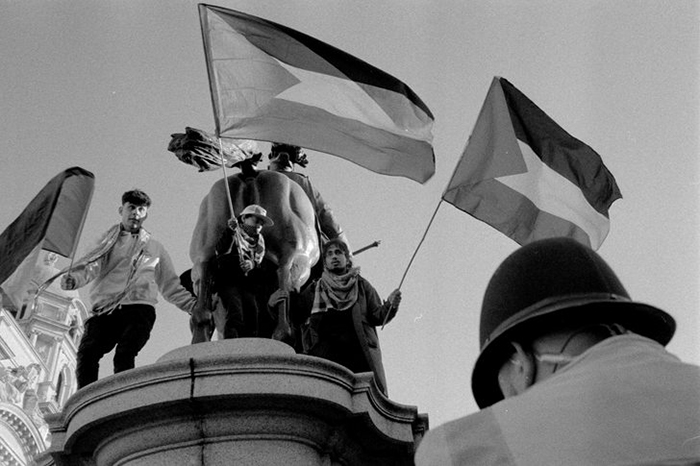
Protest in London over the Gaza war, October 2023

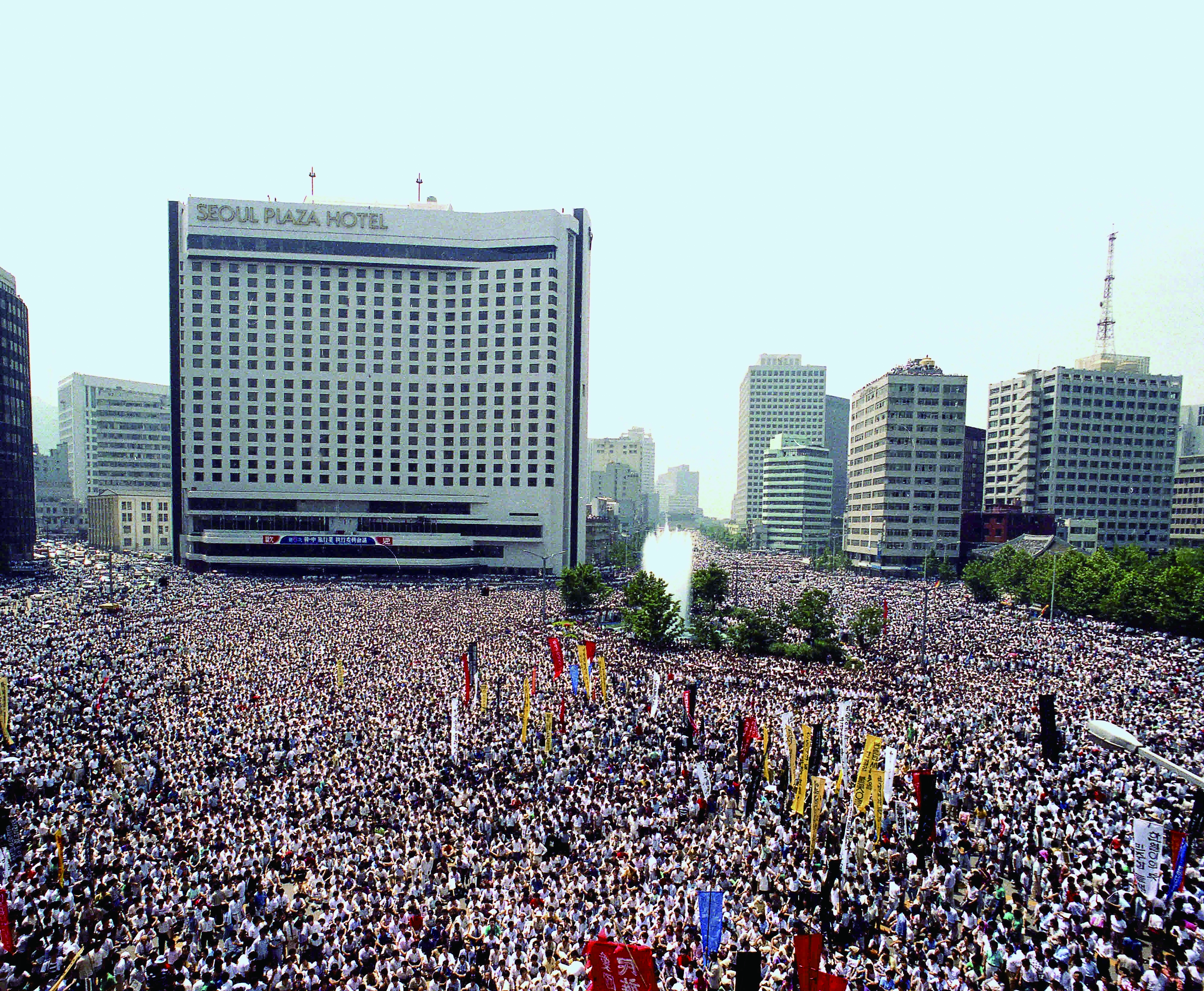
Crowds gather at the state funeral of Lee Han-yeol in Seoul, 9 July 1987

Unaddressed protests may grow and widen into civil resistance, dissent, activism, riots, insurgency, revolts, and political or social revolution. Some examples of protests include:

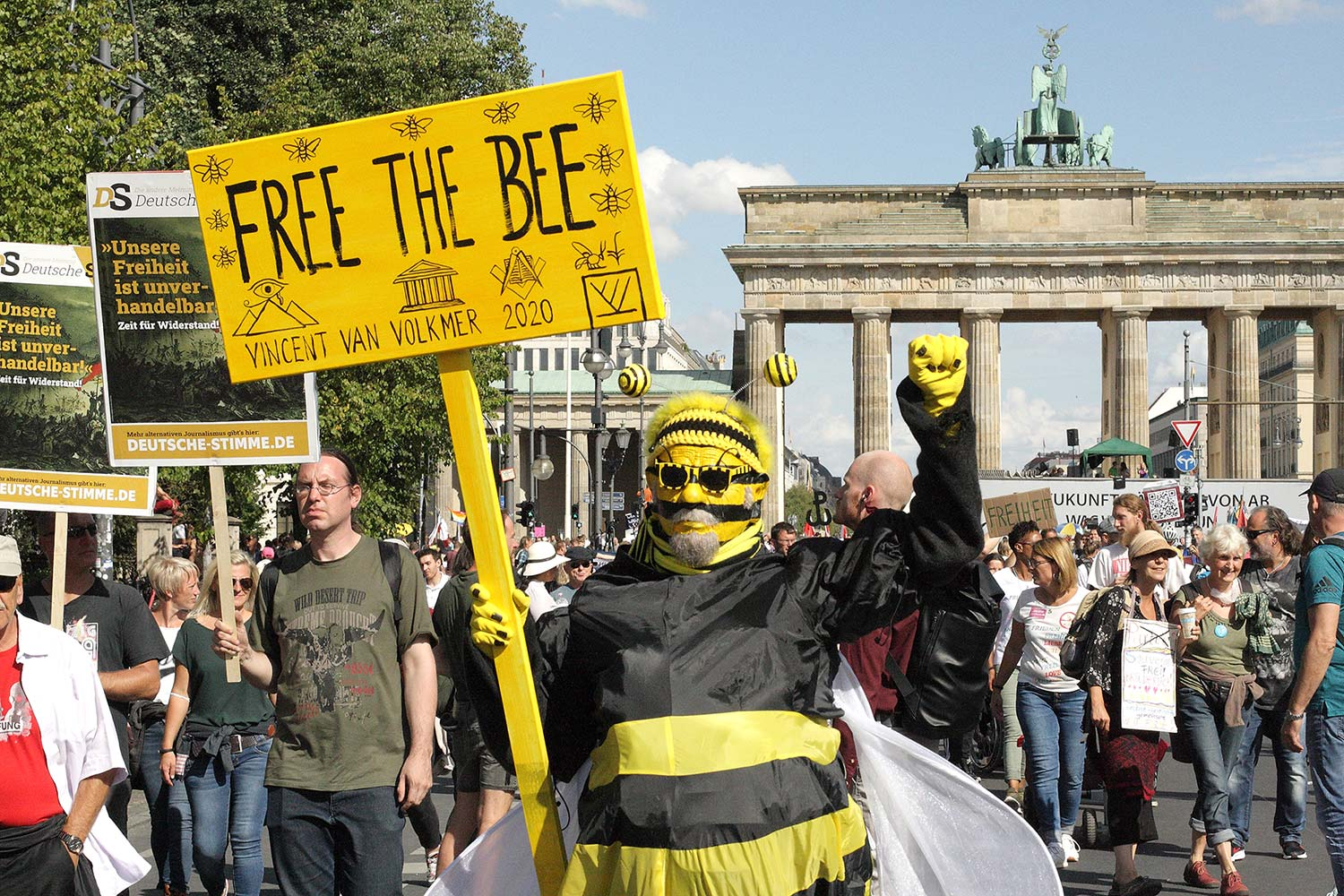
Protester with a "Free The Bee" placard during the COVID-19 protests in Berlin on 29 August 2020, near the Brandenburg Gate

- Protestant Reformation in Northern Europe in the early 16th century
- North America in the 1770s (American Revolution)
- Pennsylvania Mutiny of 1783, an anti-government protest by several hundred soldiers of the Continental Army
- 1789 French Revolution
- 1803 Haitian Revolution, the first successful black revolution against slavery
- 1866 Haymarket affair, a labor protest in Chicago led by the Anarchist Movement violently dispersed by the explosion of a bomb
- New York shirtwaist strike of 1909
- Mohandas Gandhi's 1930 Salt March to protest the colonial salt tax in India
- 1963 Birmingham Children's Crusade, part of the civil rights movement.
- 1963 March on Washington for Jobs and Freedom, a key moment in the Civil rights movement
- Selma to Montgomery marches of 1965, part of the Civil Rights Movement
- Protests against the Vietnam War
- Mexico 68
- 1968 Takeover of Vanha in Helsinki, Finland
- 1969 Stonewall riots, protesting police mass arrest of homosexuals in New York City
- The People Power Revolution in the Philippines
- 1976 Thai military personnel, police and right wing nationalistic milita shooting at peaceful protesters the Thammasat University of Thailand.
- The Solidarity (Polish trade union) Movement's protests against Soviet Communism in Poland from 1980 to 1989
- June Democratic Struggle, South Korean pro-democracy movement in 1987
- The Tiananmen Square protests of 1989
- The Alexanderplatz demonstrations on 4–9 November 1989, which culminated in the Fall of the Berlin Wall
- The many ACT-UP AIDS protests of the late 1980s and early 1990s
- The protests in Jakarta (Includes:Reformasi) against the Dictatorship of Suharto in 1998
- Japanese Canadians Protest of their Dispossession
- The Seattle WTO Ministerial Conference of 1999 protest activity against the World Trade Organization
- Anti-globalization protests in Prague in 2000
- S11- Anti World Economic Forum protests in Melbourne, 2000
- Anti-globalization protests in Genoa from 18 to 22 July 2001
- 15 February 2003 Iraq War Protest
- Anti-nuclear protests
- 2007 Bersih rally
- 2010 Thai political protests
- 2011 Iranian protests
- Arab Spring protests
- Impact of the Arab Spring
- Occupy Wall Street protests
- Bersih Malaysia protests
- Gezi Park protests in 2013 in Turkey
- June 2013 Egyptian protests
- Euromaidan protests in Ukraine, November 2013 – February 2014
- Black Lives Matter-led protests on 13 July 2013
- Sunflower Student Movement
- Protests in Thailand in 2013-2014
- Add the Words gay and transgender rights protests in Idaho in 2014
- 2014 Hong Kong Umbrella Movement
- 2016 South Korean protests
- 2017 Jallikattu protests
- 2017–2019 Romanian protests
- Dakota Access Pipeline protests
- 2018 Tommy Robinson protests
- 2018 Sadiq Khan protests
- March for Our Lives protests
- 2018 Armenian Velvet Revolution
- 2018–2019 Sudanese protests
- 2018–2020 Serbian protests
- 2019 Venezuelan protests
- 2019 Indonesian protests
- 2019 Bolivian protests
- 2019–20 Hong Kong protests
- Citizenship Amendment Act protests
- 2019–20 Lebanese protests
- 2019–2021 Iraqi protests
- George Floyd protests
- 2020–21 Belarusian protests
- Protests over responses to the COVID-19 pandemic
- COVID-19 protests and riots in Serbia
- 2020 Thai protests
- 2020–2021 Indian farmers' protest
- 2020–2021 United States election protests
- Mahsa Amini protests
- Protests against the Russian invasion of Ukraine
- Peruvian protests (2022–2023)
- Gaza war protests
- 2024 Columbia University pro-Palestinian campus occupation
- July Uprising
- 2024–present Serbian anti-corruption protests
- Protests against Donald Trump
- Protests against the second Trump administration
- 2025–2026 Iranian protests

== Forms ==
A protest can take many forms. Willingness to participate is influenced by individuals' ties within social networks. Social connections can affect both the spread of factual information about a protest and social pressures on participants. Willing to participate will also vary depending on the type of protest. Likelihood that someone will respond to a protest is also affected by group identification, and by the types of tactics involved.

TET passed candidates who are protesting over SSC scam in West Bengal, beneath the statue of Mahatma Gandhi in Kolkata Maidan.

The Dynamics of Collective Action project and the Global Nonviolent Action Database are two of the leading data collection efforts attempting to capture information about protest events. The Dynamics of Collective Action project considers the repertoire of protest tactics (and their definitions) to include:

- Rally or Demonstration: Demonstration, rally, or similar protest, without reference to marching or walking in a picket line or standing in a vigil. Reference to speeches, speakers, singing, or preaching, often verified by the presence of PA sound equipment and sometimes by a platform or stage. Ordinarily will include worship services, speeches, briefings.
- March: Reference to moving from one location to another; to distinguish from rotating or walking in a circle with picket signs (which is a picket).
- Vigil: Most vigils have banners, placards, or leaflets so that people passing by, despite silence from participants, can be informed about the purpose of the vigil.
- Picket: The modal (most common) activity is picketing; there may be references to a picket line, informational picketing, or holding signs; "carrying signs and walking around in a circle". Holding signs, placards, or banners is not the defining criteria; rather, it is holding or carrying those items and walking a circular route, a phrase sometimes surprisingly found in the permit application.
- Civil Disobedience: Explicit protest that involves deliberately breaking laws deemed unjust in order to protest them; crossing barricades, prohibited use of segregated facilities (such as lunch-counters or restrooms), voter registration drives (to earn non-eligible people the right to vote), or tying up phone lines.
- Ceremony: These celebrate or protest status transitions ranging from birth and death dates of individuals, organizations or nations; seasons; re-enlistment or commissioning of military personnel; or to anniversaries of any of the above. These are sometimes referenced by presenting flowers or wreaths commemorating, dedicating, or celebrating status transitions or their anniversary; e.g., an annual merchant marine memorial service, celebrating Hanukkah or Easter, or celebrating the birthday of Martin Luther King Jr.
- Dramaturgical Demonstration
- Motorcade: Vehicular procession (electoral campaigns or other issues)
- Protest camps or peace camps, a long-standing protest or occupation, a form of intentional community
- Information distribution: Tabling/petition gathering, lobbying, letter-writing campaigns, or teach-ins.
- Symbolic Display: e.g., a menorah or creche scene, graffiti, cross burning, sign, or standing display.
- Attack by collective group (not-one-on-one assault, crime, rape): Motivation for attack is the "other group's identity", as in gay-bashing or lynching. Can also include verbal attacks or threats. (See hate crime)
- Riot, melee, mob violence: Large-scale (50+), use of violence by instigators against persons, property, police, or buildings separately or in combination, lasting several hours.
- Strike, slow down, sick-ins, and employee work protest of any kind: Regular strike through failure of negotiations or wildcat air strike. (Make note if a wildcat strike.)
- Boycott: Organized refusal to buy or use a product or service. Examples: rent strikes, Montgomery bus boycotts
- Press Conference: Only if specifically named as such in report, and must be the predominant activity form. Could involve disclosure of information to "educate the public" or influence various decision-makers.
- Organization formation announcement or meeting announcement: Meeting or press conference to announce the formation of a new organization.
- Conflict, attack or clash (no instigator): This includes any boundary conflict in which no instigator can be identified, i.e. Black/white conflicts, abortion/anti-abortion conflicts.
- Prayer Walk: A prayer walk is an activity that consists of walking and praying at the same time. It is done not for the physical benefit but for the spiritual exercise, either publicly functioning as a demonstration or rally.
- Lawsuit: Legal maneuver by social movement organization or group.
- Peopleless Protest: Simultaneous online and offline protests involving physical representations of protesters in public spaces that are subsequently assembled online. Developed in Europe during the COVID-19 pandemic. Holographic projections of protesters were used in Spain to highlight the use of anti-protest laws in 2015.

UCL, anarchist protest in France, on 16 October during the COVID-19 pandemic

The Global Nonviolent Action Database uses Gene Sharp's classification of 198 methods of nonviolent action. There is considerable overlap with the Dynamics of Collective Action repertoire, although the GNA repertoire includes more specific tactics. Together, the two projects help define tactics available to protesters and document instances of their use.

== Typology ==
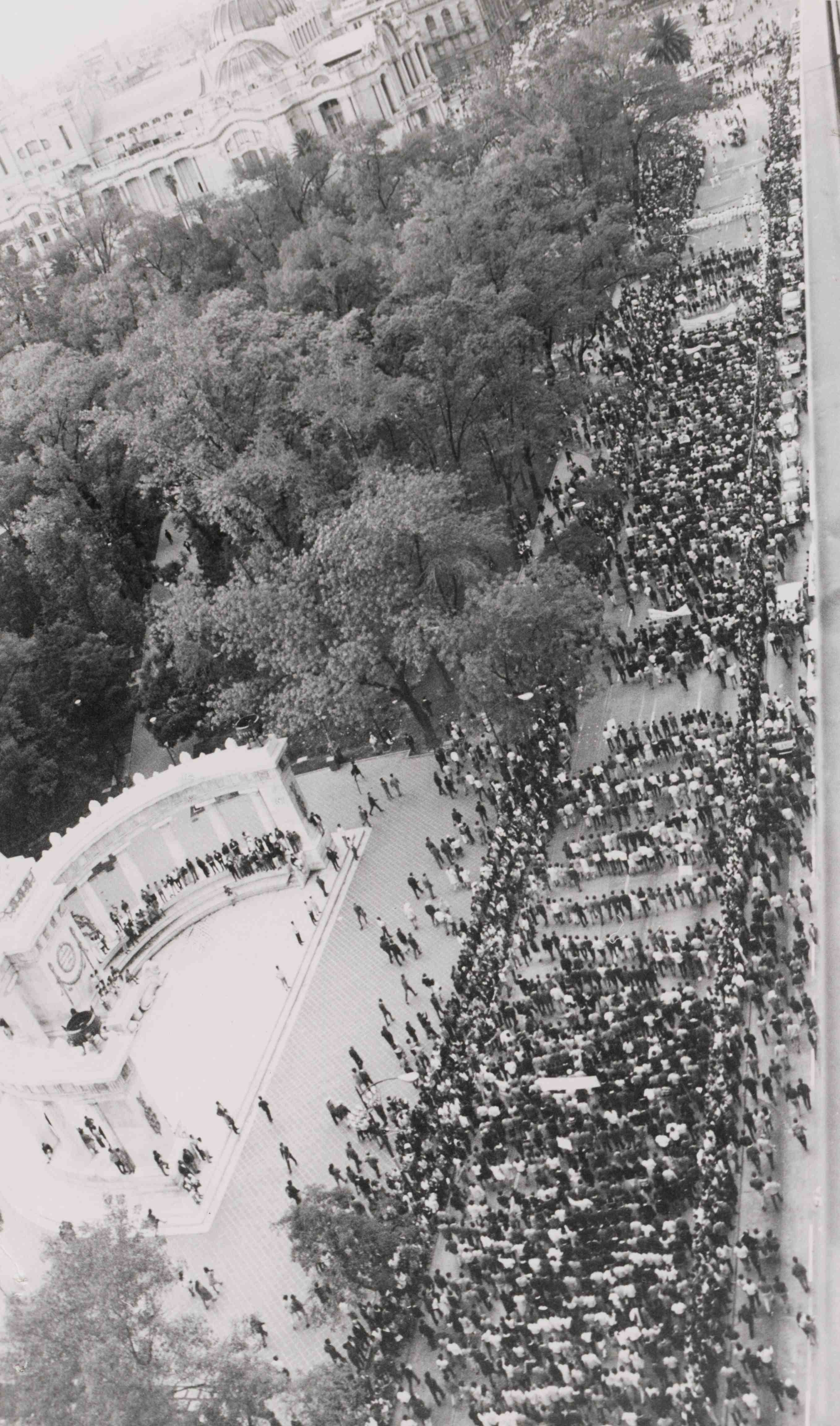
March next to the Benito Juárez Hemicycle, 27 August 1968, Mexico City

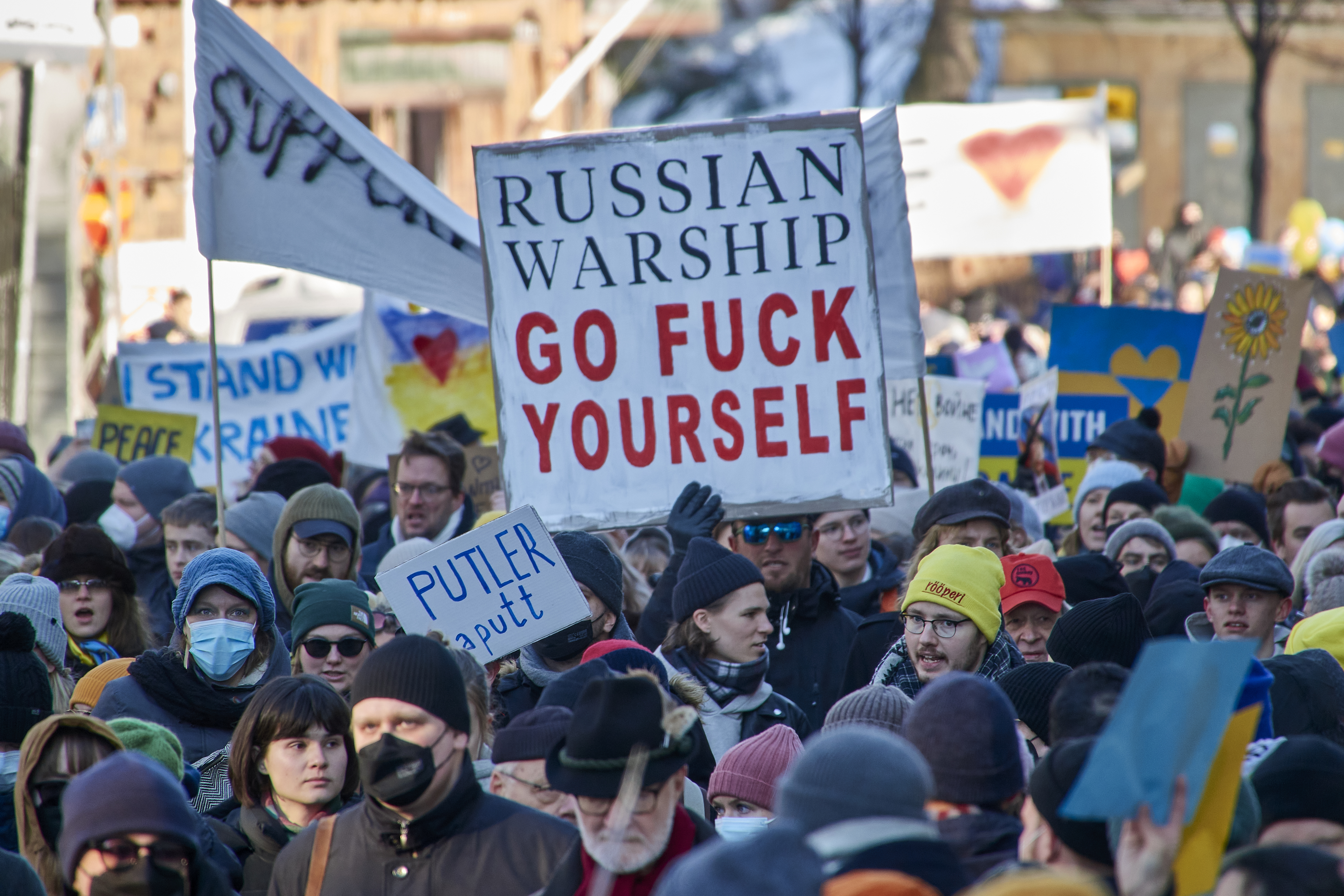
Street protesters with signs demonstrating in Helsinki, Finland, after Russia invaded Ukraine in February 2022

Thomas Ratliff and Lori Hall have devised a typology of six broad activity categories of the protest activities described in the Dynamics of Collective Action project.

- Literal, symbolic, aesthetic and sensory – Artistic, dramaturgical, and symbolic displays (street theater, dancing, etc.) including use of images, objects, graphic art, musical performances, or vocal/auditory exhibitions (speech-making, chanting, etc.). May also include tactile exchanges of information (petitions, leaflets, etc.) and the destruction of objects of symbolic or political value. Highly visible and most diverse category of activity; impacts on society (police response, media focus, impact on potential allies, etc.) often are underestimated.
- Solemnity and the sacred – Vigils, prayer, or rallies, in the form of religious service, candlelight vigils, cross or coffin bearing etc. All directly related to the Durkheimian "sacred", or some form of religious or spiritual practice, belief, or ideology. Events where sacred activity is the primary focus are rarely responded to by police with force or presence. Solemnity usually provides a distinct quietness or stillness, changing the energy, description, and interpretation of such events.
- Institutional and conventional – Institutionalized activity or activity highly dependent on formal political processes and social institutions (press conferences, lawsuits, lobbying, etc.). Often conflated with non-confrontational and nonviolent activities in research as the other or reference category. More acceptable because it operates, to some degree, within the system. Historically contentious issue in regard to the practice of protest due to this integration within the system.
- Movement in space – Marches or parades (processional activities) from one spatio-temporal location to another, with beginning or ending places sometimes chosen for symbolic reasons. Picket lines often used in labor strikes but can be used by non-labor actors but the key differences between picket and processionals are the distance of movement. Events that take the form of a procession are logistically much more difficult to police (even if it is for the safety of protesters). Marches are some of the largest events in this period.
- Civil disobedience – Withholding obligations, sit-ins, blockades, shop-ins, occupations, bannering, "camping", etc., are all specific activities which constitute the tactical form of civil disobedience. In some way, these activities directly or technically break the law. Usually given most attention by researchers, media, and authorities. Often conflated with violence and threats because of direct action and confrontational nature, but should serve as a distinct category of action (both in the context of tactical and strategic planning and in the control of activity).
- Collective violence and threats – Collective violence such as pushing, shoving, hitting, punching, damaging property, throwing objects, verbal threats, etc., is usually committed by a relative few out of many protesters (even tens of thousands). It is rare in occurrence and rarely condoned by the public or onlookers (particularly the media). Usually met with equivalent or overwhelming force in response by authorities.

Some forms of direct action listed in this article are also public demonstrations or rallies:

- Protest march, a historically and geographically common form of nonviolent action by groups of people.
- Picketing, a form of protest in which people congregate outside a place of work or location where an event is taking place. Often, this is done in an attempt to dissuade others from going in ("crossing the picket line"), but it can also be done to draw public attention to a cause.
- Street protesters demonstrate in areas with high visibility, often employing handmade placards such as sandwich boards or picket signs in order to maximize exposure and interaction with the public.
- Lockdowns and lock-ons are a way to stop movement of an object like a structure or tree, and to thwart the removal of actual protesters from the location. Users employ various chains, locks and even the sleeping dragon for impairment of those trying to remove them with a matrix of composted materials.
- Die-ins are a form of protest where participants simulate being dead (with varying degrees of realism). In the simplest form of a die-in, protesters simply lie down on the ground and pretend to be dead, sometimes covering themselves with signs or banners. Much of the effectiveness depends on the posture of the protesters, for when not properly executed, the protest might look more like a "sleep-in". For added realism, simulated wounds are sometimes painted on the bodies, or bandages, usually made to appear bloody, are used.
- Protest song is a song which protests perceived problems in society. Every major movement in Western history has been accompanied by its own collection of protest songs, from slave emancipation to women's suffrage, the labor movement, civil rights, the anti-war movement, the feminist movement, the environmental movement. Over time, the songs have come to protest more abstract, moral issues, such as injustice, racial discrimination, the morality of war in general (as opposed to purely protesting individual wars), globalization, inflation, social inequalities, and incarceration.
- Radical cheerleading. The idea is to ironically re-appropriate the aesthetics of cheerleading, for example by changing the chants to promote feminism and left-wing causes. Many radical cheerleaders (some of whom are male, transgender or non-gender identified) are in appearance far from the stereotypical image of a cheerleader.
- Critical Mass bike rides have been perceived as protest activities. A 2006 New Yorker article described Critical Mass' activity in New York City as "monthly political-protest rides", and characterized Critical Mass as a part of a social movement; the U.K. e-zine Urban75, which advertises as well as publishes photographs of the Critical Mass event in London, describes this as "the monthly protest by cyclists reclaiming the streets of London". However, Critical Mass participants have insisted that these events should be viewed as "celebrations" and spontaneous gatherings, not as protests or organized demonstrations. This stance allows Critical Mass to argue a legal position that its events can occur without advance notification of local police.
- Toyi-toyi is a Southern African dance originally from Zimbabwe that became famous for its use in political protests in the apartheid-era South Africa. See Protest in South Africa.

=== Written demonstration ===
Written evidence of political or economic power, or democratic justification may also be a way of protesting.

- Petitions
- Letters (to show political power by the volume of letters): Used by some letter writing campaigns, especially those with a form letter that supporters are given to sign

=== Civil disobedience demonstrations ===
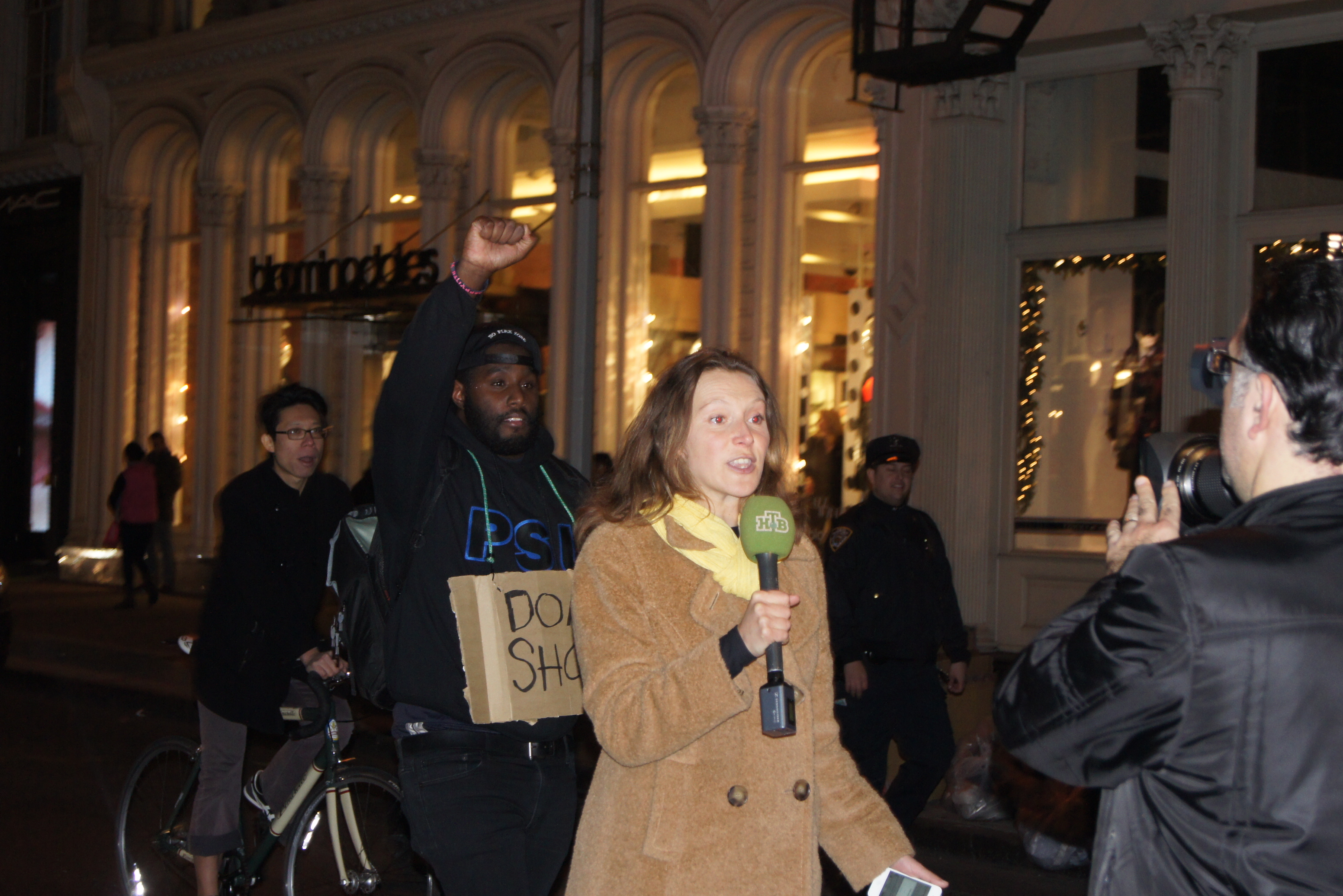
A protester photobombing a news reporter during a protest in New York City

Any protest could be civil disobedience if a "ruling authority" says so, but the following are usually civil disobedience demonstrations:

- Public nudity or topfree (to protest indecency laws or as a publicity stunt for another protest such as a war protest) or animal mistreatment (e.g. PETA's campaign against fur). See also Nudity and protest.
- Sit-in
- Photobombing – disrupting an event being broadcast live
- Raasta roko – people blocking auto traffic with their bodies
- Silent protest
- Lebenslaute

=== As a residence ===
- Peace camp
- Formation of a tent city
- Camp for Climate Action

=== Destructive ===
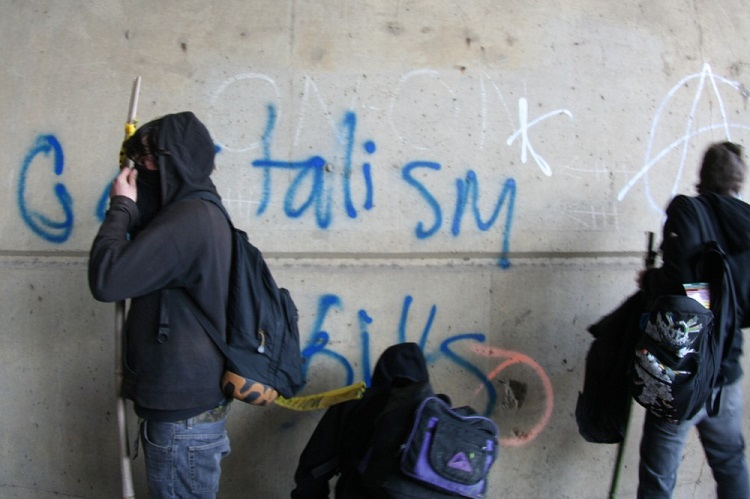
Black bloc members spray graffiti during an Iraq War Protest in Washington, D.C.

- Hatchetation
- Vandalism – Smashing windows or spraying graffiti is used as a form of riot, and is sometimes employed by black bloc groups.
- Riot – Protests or attempts to end protests sometimes lead to rioting.
- Looting – stealing goods from establishments or businesses (takes place during riots)
- Self-immolation
- Suicide
- Hunger strike
- Bombing

=== Non-destructive ===
- Silent protest – protests or parades in which participants are nonviolent and usually silent in an attempt to avoid violent confrontation with military or police forces. This tactic was effectively used during the Arab Spring in cities such as Tehran and Cairo.

=== Direct action ===
- Civil resistance
- Nonviolent resistance
- Occupation
- Public shaming

=== Against a government ===
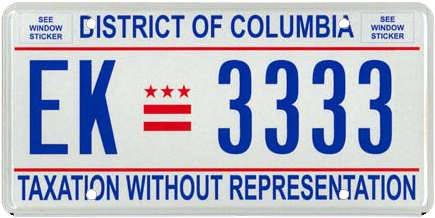
The District of Columbia issues license plates protesting the "taxation without representation" that occurs due to its special status.

- Tax resistance
- Conscientious objector
- Flag desecration

=== Anti-war movements ===
- Port Militarization Resistance – protests which attempt to prevent military cargo shipments

=== Against a planning application or development ===
- NIMBY ("not in my backyard") – protest by residents of an area against a development in the area they see as undesirable

=== By government employees ===
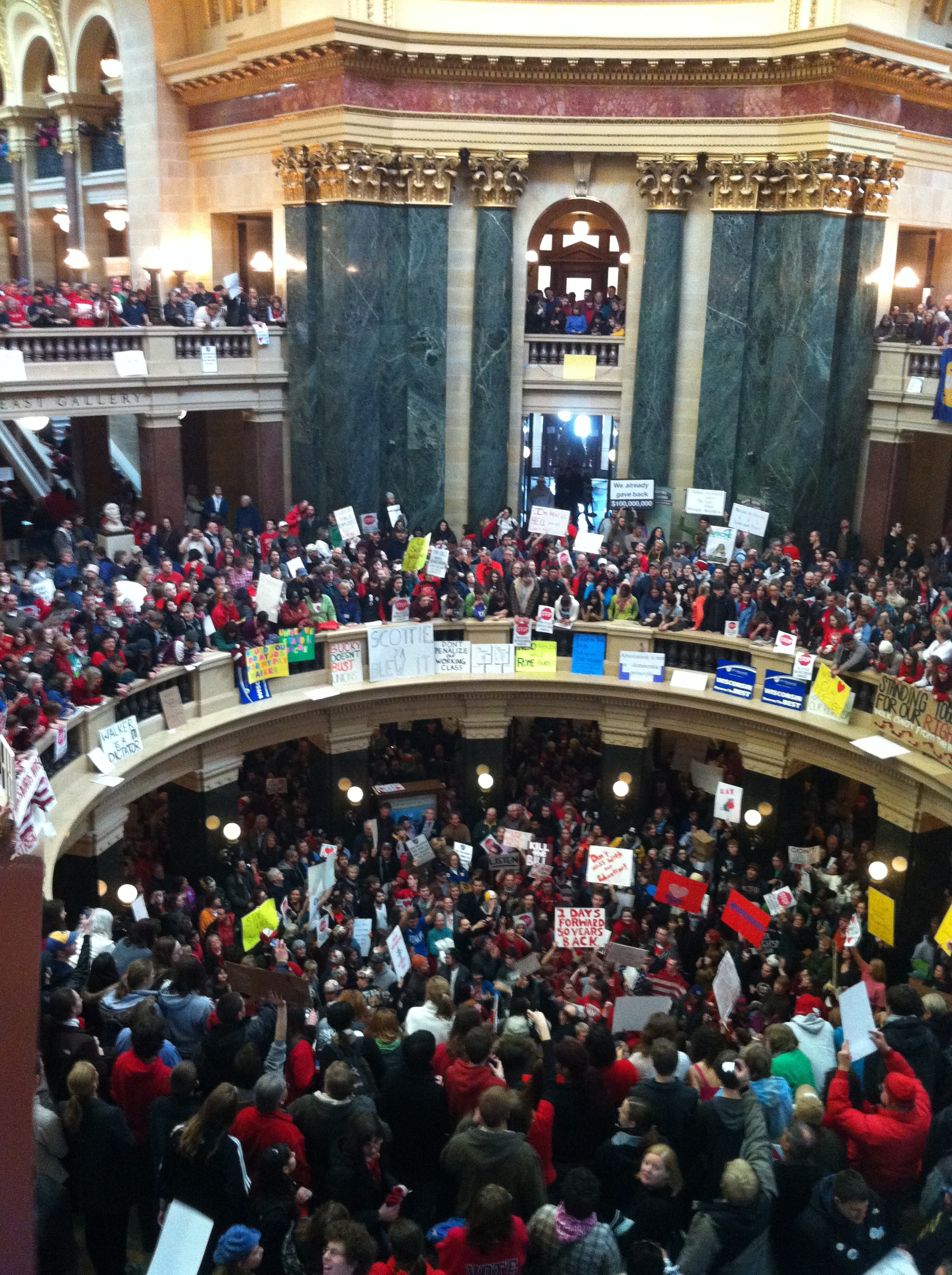
Protest inside the Wisconsin State Capitol

- Bully pulpit
- Judicial activism
- Filibuster

=== Job action ===
- Strike action
- Walkout
- Work-to-rule

=== In sports ===
- U.S. national anthem kneeling protests

=== By management ===
- Lockout

=== By tenants ===
- Rent strike

=== By consumers ===
- Boycott
- Consumer Court

=== By ordinary citizens as bank depositors ===
- Organized politically-motivated bank run such as Reform Act 1832

=== Information ===
- Informative letters, letter writing campaigns, letters to the editor
- Teach-in
- Zine
- Soap-boxing

=== Civil disobedience to censorship ===
- Samizdat (distributing censored materials)
- Protest graffiti

=== By Internet and social networking ===
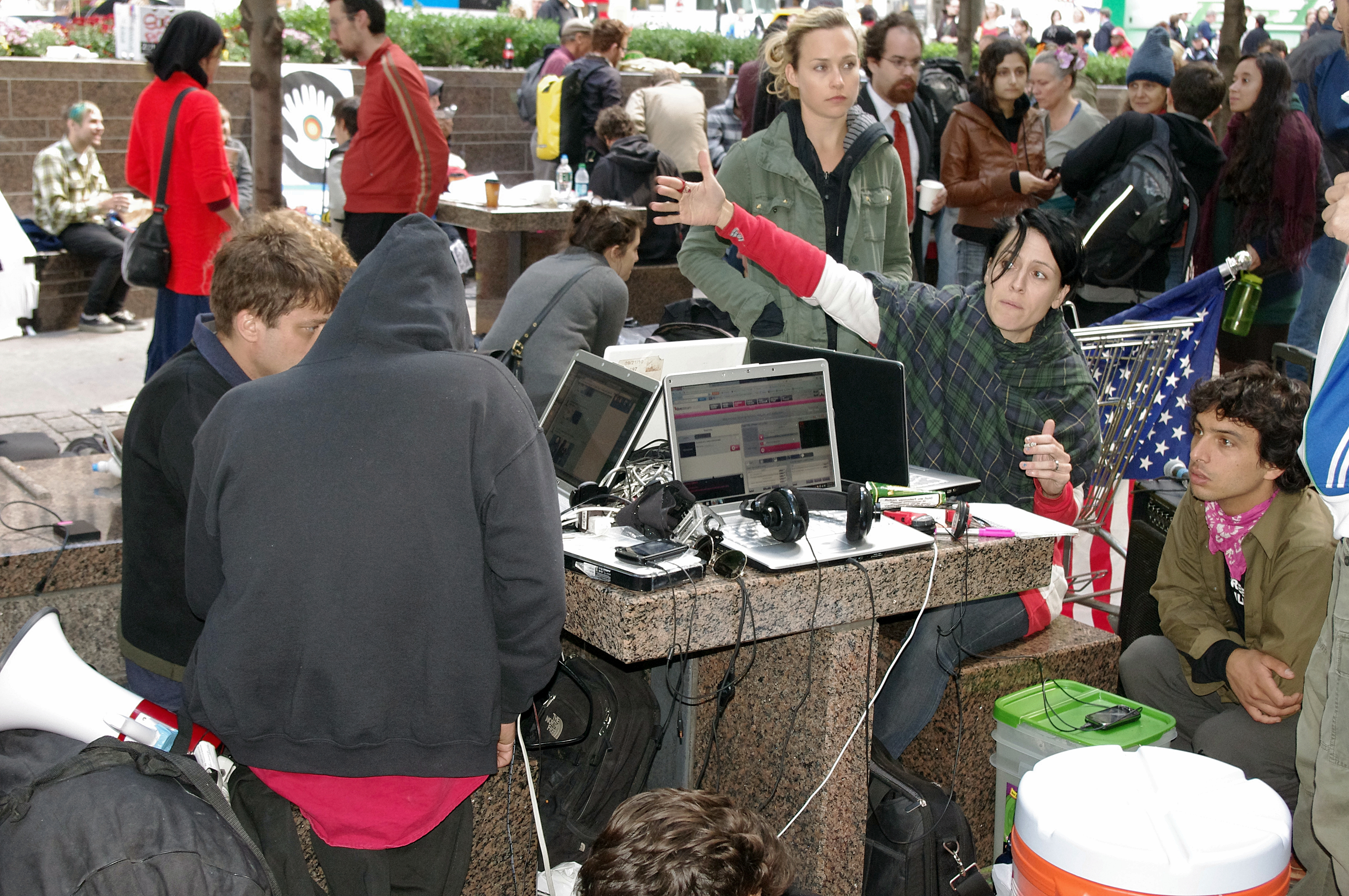
Occupy Wall Street protesters in Zuccotti Park using the Internet to get their message out over social networking as events happen, September 2011

Blogging and social networking have become effective tools to register protest and grievances. Protests can express views or news, and use viral networking to reach out to thousands of people. With protests on the rise from the U.S. election season of 2016 going into 2017, protesters became aware that using their social media during a protest could make them an easier target for government surveillance.

=== Literature, art and culture ===
- Culture jamming

=== Against religious or ideological institutions ===
- Recusancy
- Book burning

== Protest policing ==
Seattle Police Department officers at the George Floyd protests, 2020

Protest policing or public order policing is part of a state’s response to political dissent and social movements. Police maintenance of public order during protest is an essential component of liberal democracy, with military response to protest being more common under authoritarian regimes.

Australasian, European, and North American democratic states have all experienced increased surveillance of protest movements and more militarized protest policing since 1995 and through the first decades of the 21st century.

Criminalization of dissent is legislation or law enforcement that penalizes political dissent. It may also be accomplished through media that controls public discourse to delegitimize critics of the state. Study of protest criminalization places protest policing in a broader framework of criminology and sociology of law.

In the UK, in a four day period in 2023, policing data showed that 67 protests occurred, requiring 622 police officers to attend. The estimated financial cost of this was £140,346. Protests impact the communities they occur within and policing these costs a considerable amount.

== Economic effects against companies ==
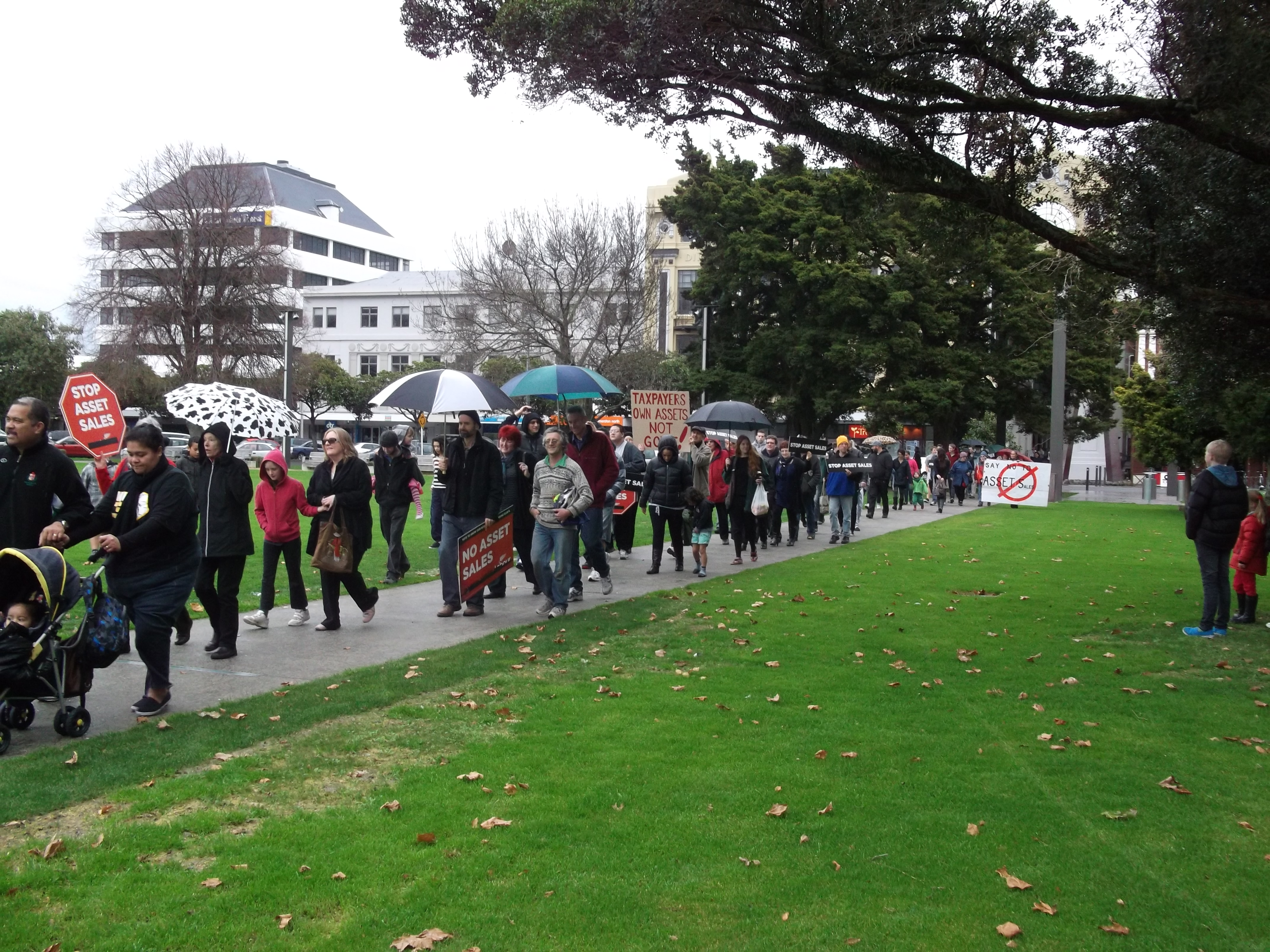
Protest march in Palmerston North, New Zealand

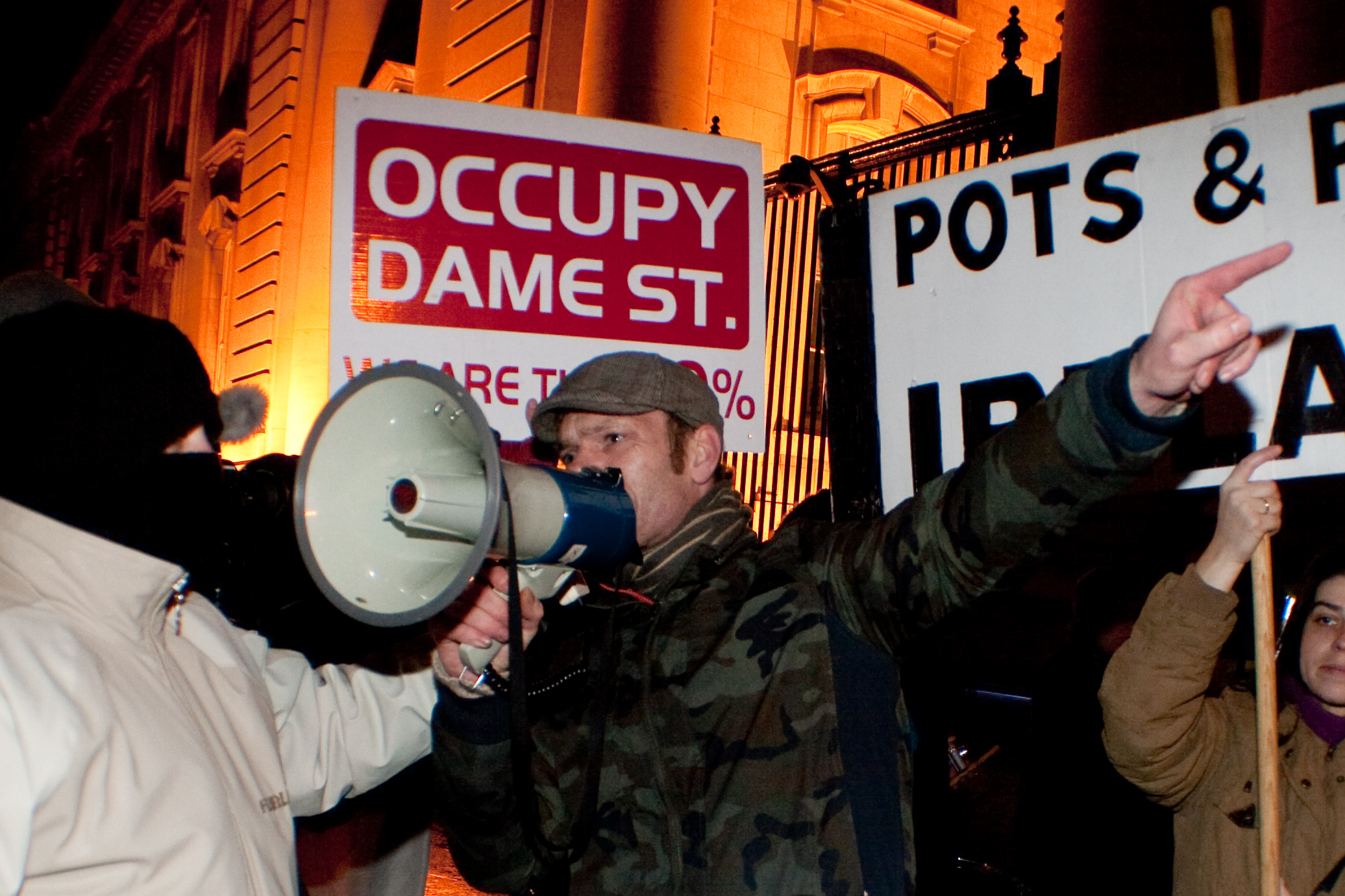
Protesters outside the Oireachtas in Dublin, Republic of Ireland

A study of 342 US protests covered by The New York Times newspaper from 1962 to 1990 showed that such public activities usually affected the company's publicly traded stock price. The most intriguing aspect of the study's findings revealed that the amount of media coverage the event received was of the most importance to this study. Stock prices fell an average of one-tenth of a percent for every paragraph printed about the event.

== See also ==
- List of protests in the 21st century
- Activist Wisdom, a book about protesters in Australia
- Anti-globalization movement
- Fare strike
- First Amendment to the United States Constitution
- Coup d'état
- Revolution
- Riot
- People power
- Two Minutes Hate
- Struggle session
- Emmanuel Goldstein
- Mass mobilization
- Burning of the Papal Bull by Martin Luther, during Protestant reformation and the Counter-Reformation of the Catholic Church in Western and Central Europe, Mainland Europe, Europe
- 1992 Los Angeles riots
- Gandhigiri
- "I Protest"
- List of uprisings led by women
- Protest art
- Protest paradigm
- Public library advocacy
- Right to protest
- Satyagraha
- Social criticism
- Tactical frivolity
