= Kara Tepe refugee camp =

Refugee camp in Greece

Coordinates: 39.1287°N 26.5439°E

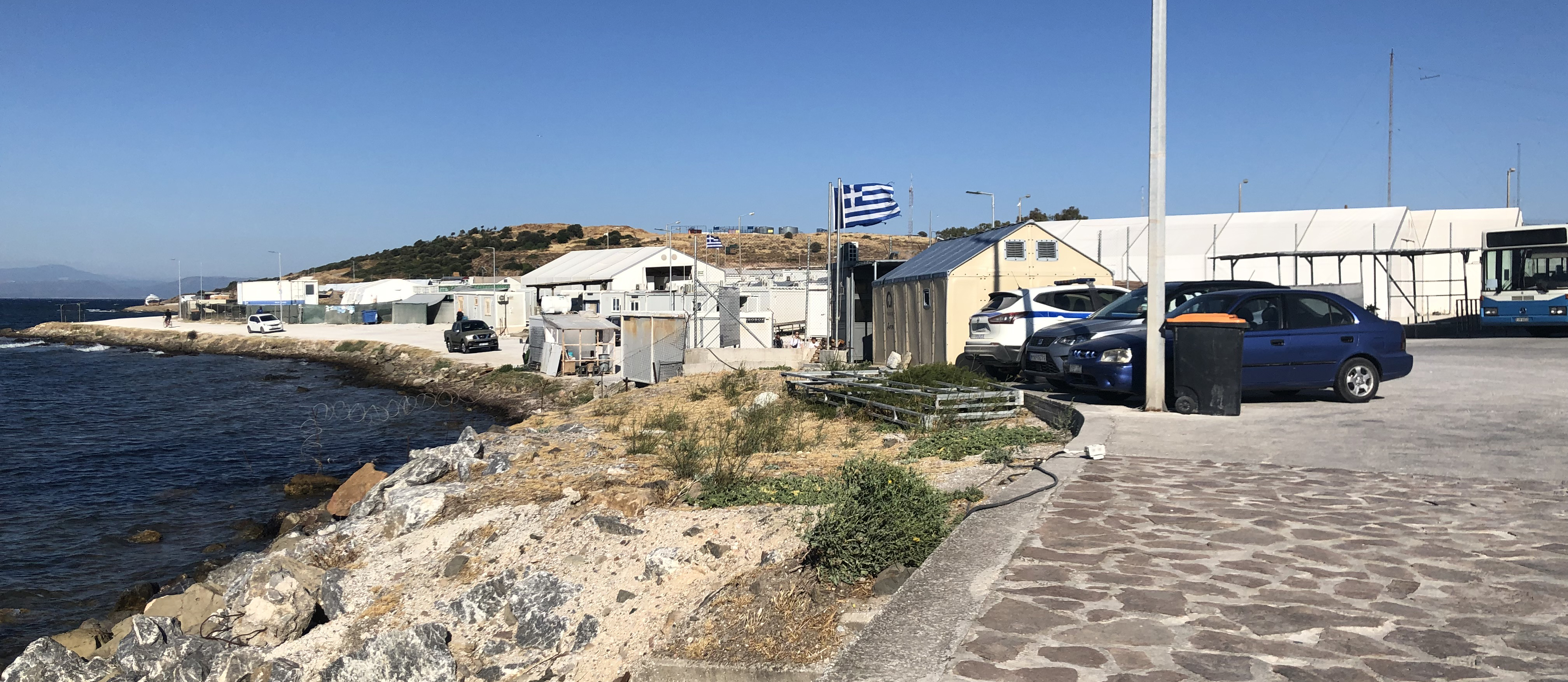
Entrance to Kara Tepe Refugee Camp, Lesvos Island, Greece. Photographer: James O'Leary

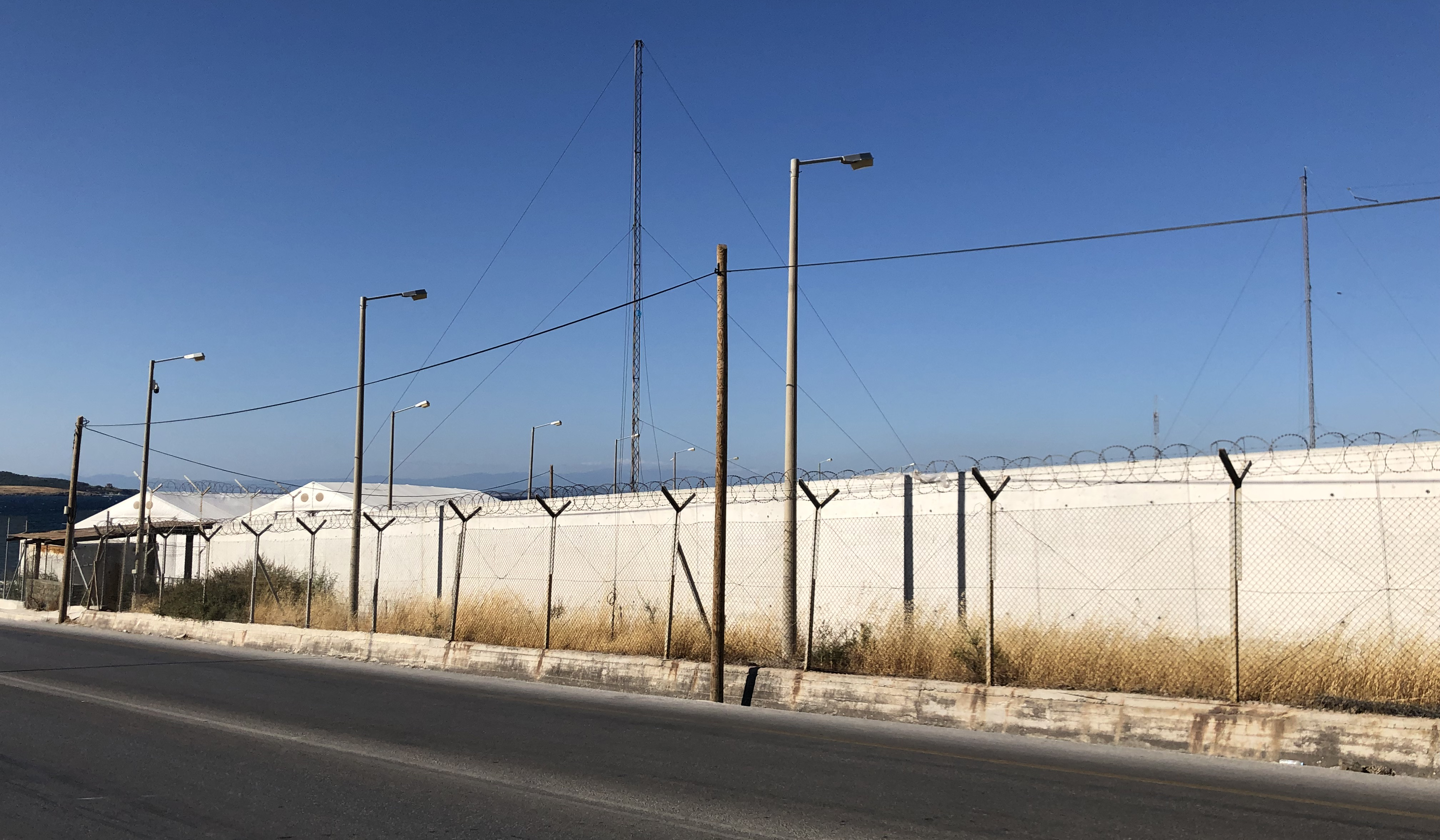
Perimeter Wall of Kara Tepe Refugee Camp, Lesvos Island, Greece.

Kara Tepe (Greek: Καρά Τεπέ, from Turkish for "black hill") is a refugee camp that is located in the area of Mavrovouni in Lesvos, Greece. The camp is managed by the Municipality of Mytilene and UNHCR in collaboration with the NGOs that operate there; among them are IRC, Médecins du Monde, METAdrasi, SOS Villages, Caritas Hellas, Movement on the Ground and Because we Carry. Médecins Sans Frontières has a clinic in Mytilini that serves patients from the Kara Tepe camp who are referred to them by outreach teams.

== Overview ==
The camp has provided temporary housing for asylum seekers. Kara Tepe was the overflow site for Moria refugee camp, the main registration center in Greece, through which new arrivals would be processed. Asylum seekers living in Kara Tepe are able to leave and reenter the site daily.

The majority of individuals living in the camp are of Afghani, Iraqi or Syrian origin. According to a survey conducted in December 2016, asylum seekers spent an average of four months at the Kara Tepe camp.

== History ==
In August 2017, Kara Tepe's accommodation capacity was expanded by 56% to make room for up to 1300 persons. UNHCR reported that 260 new accommodation units had been installed at the camp in 2017.

After the September 2020 fire destroyed the Moria camp, the Greek government approved the construction of a new closed reception centre at Vastria (near the village of Nees Kydonies), scheduled to be completed by summer 2022. However, the Greek Counsil of State revoked the construction permit due to a lack of an environmental study, and construction work has since been put on hold.

== See also ==
- Moria refugee camp
- Pikpa camp
- Temporary Kara Tepe Refugee Camp
