= Temporary Kara Tepe Refugee Camp =

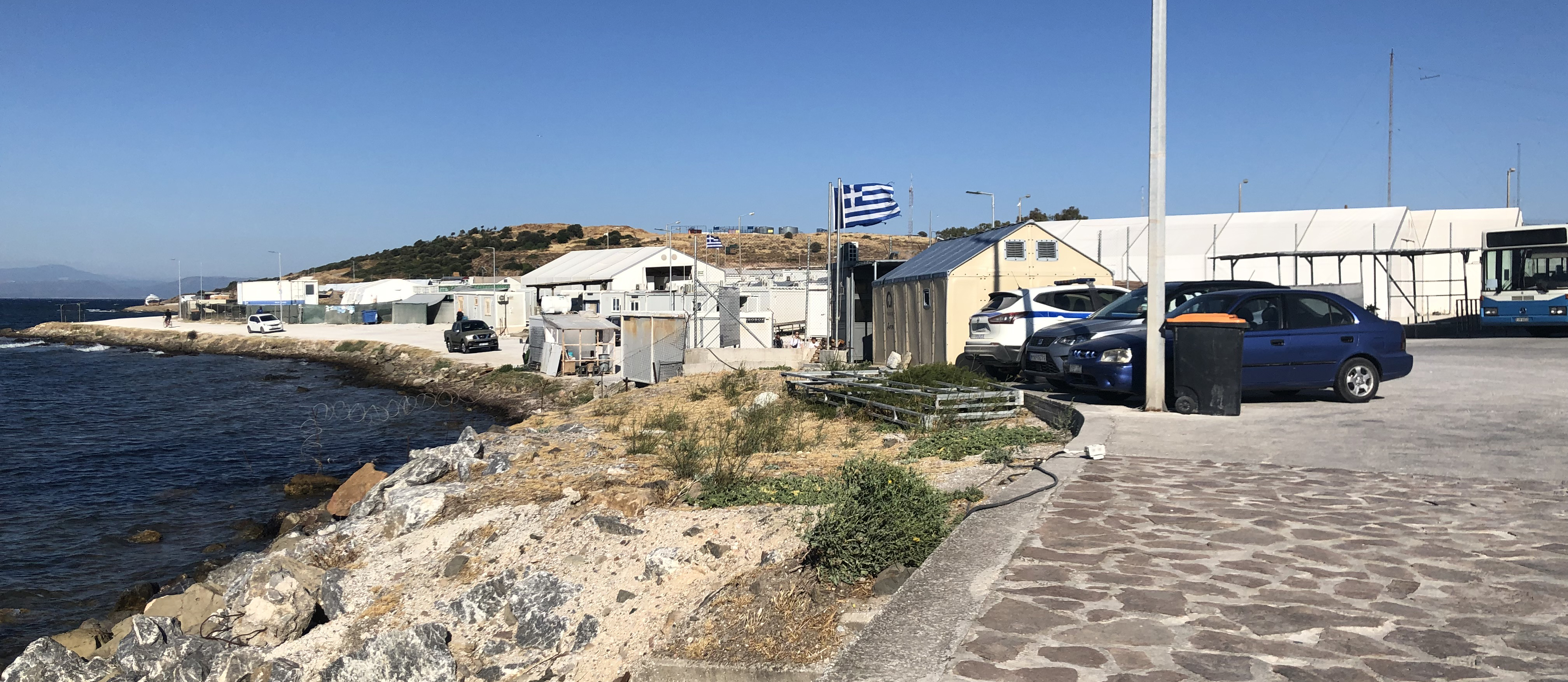
Entrance to Kara Tepe Camp, Lesvos, Greece.

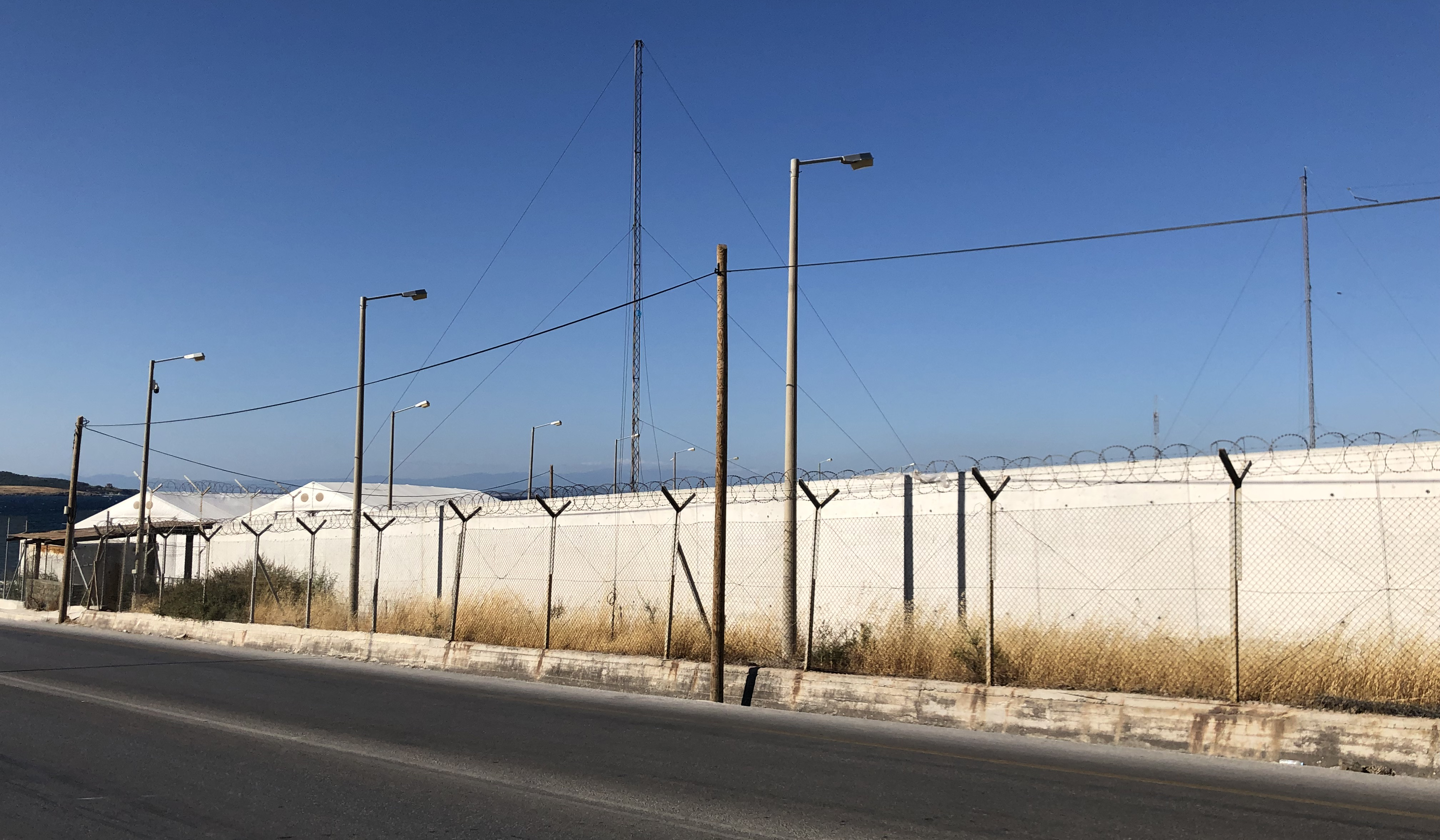
Perimeter Wall to Kara Tepe Camp, Lesvos, Greece.

The temporary Kara Tepe camp is a refugee camp located in the area of Mavrovouni, north of Mytilene on the island of Lesvos, Greece, which was constructed following fires which destroyed Moria refugee camp on and after 8 September 2020. It is located next to, although separated from, the other, longstanding Kara Tepe Refugee Camp which still houses a number of asylum seekers.

== Construction and Entry into the Camp ==
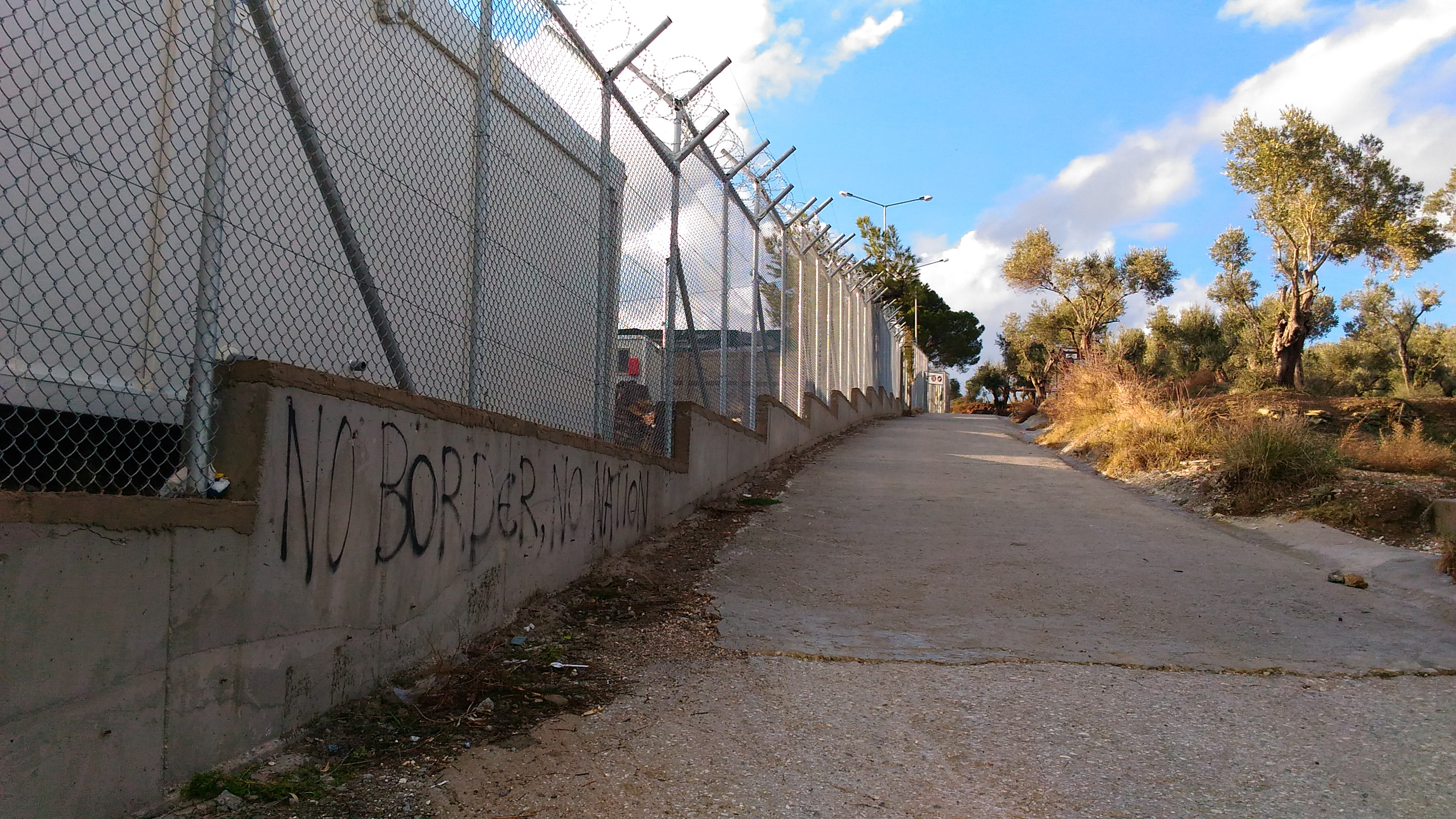
The old Moria Refugee Camp

Residents were forced to spend days sleeping along a main road before they could enter the new temporary camp, that had been closed off by army vehicles after the fire. They were then slowly admitted to the new camp after being tested for coronavirus. Approximately 243 people tested positive for the virus upon entry to the camp. Those who tested positive were immediately quarantined.

Multiple aid groups and Greek political party Syriza criticised the Greek government for building the facility on the Kara Tepe site, which abuts the sea on two sides and is exposed to the elements. By October 2020, it was reported that 80 tents had already been destroyed by the severe weather. The location was selected after the European Asylum Support Office (EASO) brought an expert group of engineers from five EU countries to assess suitability of several locations on the island. The EU contributed 5.36 million Euros to the installation of this facility. Greek authorities state that the facility is temporary however a permanent facility would not be expected to be ready until late 2021. The site was previously used as a firing range by the Greek army, and concerns have been raised about both unexploded bombs and the possibility of lead poisoning.

== Conditions in the Camp ==
In December 2020, the camp accommodated approximately 7200 asylum seekers. Reports state that it fails to provide for many basic human needs. There have been multiple floods of the tents due to the location of the camp. There are only temporary toilets. Food is generally reported to be insufficient and of poor quality. There are mixed reports around the reliability and safety of the electricity supply, with at least one fire having been started in the new tents as a result of the poor electrics.

== Security ==
Entry and exit to and from the camp remains tightly controlled. Exit is only permitted between 07:00 and 21:00. This was initially implemented as part of the governments COVID response plan, but when lockdown rules eased for local Greek residents, tight restrictions remained in place for the refugees living in the camp. The police presence in the new camp is significantly more than the old camp, and residents are examined for weapons on re-entry. Violence within the camp has considerably reduced. More stringent measures are being taken to prevent NGOs accessing the camp.

== Coronavirus ==
COVID testing has been implemented by EODY in partnership with the WHO. Contact tracing is highly challenging due to the large numbers of people living in each tent, and crowding in queues for basic amenities. Masks are mandatory everywhere in the camp and are generally provided by NGOs. Water and soap are offered at a handful of handwashing stations, This requires most refugees to walk some distance through crowds or across muddy ground.

== Education ==
Education in the camp, as in Moria camp, is extremely limited, despite thousands of children spending significant periods of their life in the facilities. Covid-19 rules have further impacted provision. There are NGOs available to provide education however as of January 2021 there are only 3 tents available for this purpose. Some NGOs have had to limit their programs due to the pandemic. Residents of the camp wishing to organise their own education reportedly face even more hurdles in trying to secure a suitable location.

Asylum seekers arrive to Lesvos during the Refugee Crisis

== The Future ==
It is expected that the residents of this camp will be moved to the permanent facility within the next year. The new camp will reportedly include living containers, health care facilities as well as recreational spaces and areas for education. It will have capacity for 5000 people and was scheduled be completed by summer 2022. However, the greek Council of State revoked the construction permit, due to a lack of an environmental study, and construction work has since been put on hold.
