= Reception and identification centers in Greece =

Refugee camps

Reception and Identification Centers in Greece, also called hotspot camps, are refugee camps for the processing of foreign nationals who come to Greece without the necessary legal formalities. In October 2019, there were a total of six such camps in Greece: five at the islands of the eastern Aegean (Lesbos, Chios, Samos, Leros and Kos) and one at the Fylakio of Evros at the northeastern border of Greece.

== Capacity ==
The total capacity of the five camps on the islands was 6,178 people (the total occupancy was 38,423 people), while the Greek government was planning to create new closed structures with a capacity of 22,000 people. These structures would replace the camps of the islands and would function both as reception and identification centers and as pre-departure centers.

== Criticisms ==
In 2018 Human Rights Watch called the Moria camp on Lesbos an "open air prison". In 2019 The New York Times reported that the Samos camp was housing 6000 refugees, equivalent to nine times its maximum capacity.

== 2020 - Moria Incident ==
In September 2020, a fire at the Moria camp on the island of Lesbos temporarily displaced 12,500 refugees. The Moria camp was destroyed and has since been replaced by a controlled access reception centre at Vastria.

== Planning ==
In 2021, the Greek Ministry of Migration and Asylum has estimated that they would need a total of 270 million euros for the creation of new or the expansion of the old camps on the islands, while for the expansion of the capacity of a pre-departure center at the Fylakio of Evros, they would require 30 million euros.

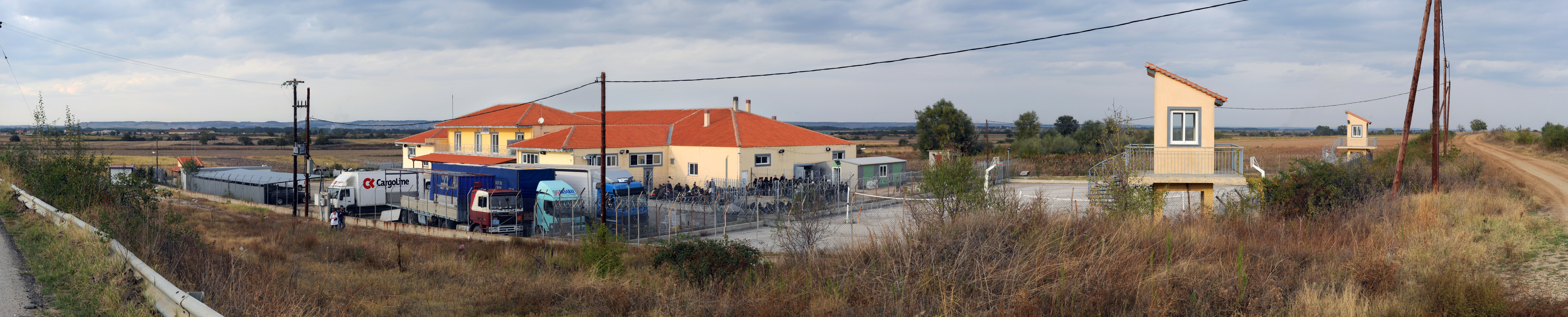
Reception and identification center at the Fylakio of Evros, Greece

== 2025 - 2026 ==
As of January 2025 there were 22 operational reception facilities (10 in the South and 12 in the North) of which 3 are specifically designed for reception of new arrivals. As of an April 2025 report the total capacity of the reception facilities was about 21,393 occupant with a rate of 56% occupancy. Almost all of the problematic "hotspot" RIC's (Lesvos, Chios, Samos, Leros, Kos) have been converted into newer and more closely monitored and controlled facilities known as Closed Controlled-Access Centres (CCAC).

In early 2026, the Greek government announced a further 3 reception centres to be built in Crete, two of which would be temporary centres and one permanent centre (CCAC). These would combat the increased flow of arrivals from the north coast of Libya to the south coast of Crete seen from 2025.

== List of active facilities ==
Centre (or Island / Region)	Type / Notes	Capacity / Occupancy / Status*
Malakasa Reception Facility (Attica, mainland)	Mainland Reception and Identification Centre/ Reception facility	Capacity ~ 3,471 places. Operative in 2025.
Diavata Reception and Identification Centre (near Thessaloniki, mainland)	Mainland Reception and Identification Centre/ CAFTAAS	Capacity ~ 936 places. Active as of 2025.
Fylakio Reception Centre (Evros, northeast border, mainland)	Mainland Reception and Identification Centre (first-arrival / registration)	Listed among the three RICs meant for first arrivals as of 2025.
Kos Closed Controlled Access Centre (island)	Island Closed Controlled-Access Centre (replaced old RIC)	Capacity 2,923 places; reported population 3,360 (as of 31 Dec 2023) — indicating overcrowding.
Lesvos Mavrovouni CCAC (island)	Island Closed Controlled-Access Centre (replacement of old RIC)	Nominal capacity 8,000 places (as of 2023), with 5,390 identified as residents by end of 2023.
Chios Chalkios CCAC (island)	Island Closed Controlled-Access Centre	Capacity 1,014 places; reportedly 1,082 residents (2023) — slight over-capacity.
Samos CCAC (island)	Island Closed Controlled-Access Centre (since 2021)	Capacity 3,650 places; population 3,890 (as of end 2023) — overcrowded.
Leros CCAC (island)	Island Closed Controlled-Access Centre (since 2021)	Capacity 2,150 places; population 2,192 (as of end 2023) — slightly over capacity.
