= Peopleless protest =

Protest involving placement of objects

A peopleless protest is a form of political demonstration where physical objects or symbols are placed in public spaces to represent protesters, rather than people gathering in person. This method gained prominence during periods when in-person gatherings were restricted, such as the COVID-19 pandemic.

== Characteristics ==
Peopleless protests typically involve three key elements:

- Individuals placing symbols or objects in public spaces separately
- Recording and documenting these symbols/objects
- Linking the digitized records online to create a unified demonstration

Common symbols used include placards, silhouettes, or other objects that represent the protesters' message. These are placed in visible public areas to draw attention.

== History ==
While forms of symbolic protest have existed historically, the specific concept of "peopleless protest" emerged in 2020 during the COVID-19 pandemic as activists sought alternatives to in-person demonstrations. Early examples included protests for refugee rights in Europe.

The term was first coined by Yunus Berndt, a social activist involved in the Europe Must Act movement, which aimed to highlight the plight of refugees in camps on Greek islands.

== Effectiveness ==
The effectiveness of peopleless protests has been a topic of discussion among activists and researchers. These protests provide several advantages, particularly in contexts where traditional forms of protest are not feasible due to public health concerns, legal restrictions, or safety risks.

=== Advantages ===
One primary advantage of peopleless protests is their ability to circumvent restrictions on public gatherings. During the COVID-19 pandemic, peopleless protests emerged as a safe alternative to traditional demonstrations, allowing activists to maintain social distancing while still making their voices heard. By using symbols and objects to represent protesters, these movements can also reduce the risk of violent crackdowns by authorities, which are often a concern in traditional protests.

Moreover, peopleless protests can be effective in drawing media attention and raising public awareness. The visual impact of symbolic objects placed in significant locations can be powerful and compelling, often garnering widespread media coverage and social media engagement.

=== Challenges ===
Despite their advantages, peopleless protests face several challenges. One significant limitation is the potential for reduced impact compared to mass gatherings. Traditional protests often rely on the physical presence of large numbers of people to convey the strength and urgency of a movement. The absence of a physical crowd can sometimes diminish the perceived threat to authorities and reduce the overall impact.

Additionally, peopleless protests may struggle to sustain momentum over time. The lack of a physical gathering can make it more challenging to build a sense of community and solidarity among participants, which is often crucial for the long-term success of social movements.

=== Modern context ===
Despite these challenges, peopleless protests have proven effective in various modern contexts. During Myanmar's protests against the 2021 coup, activists used peopleless protest tactics to avoid violent crackdowns, arranging objects in public spaces to represent protest formations. Similarly, the Fridays for Future movement in Germany utilized peopleless protests by placing placards in front of the German parliament to advocate for climate action during COVID-19 lockdowns.

While peopleless protests may not always match the impact of traditional mass gatherings, they offer a valuable alternative for activism in situations where physical presence is not possible or safe. Their effectiveness lies in their adaptability and ability to harness both physical and digital spaces to amplify their message.

== Notable incidents ==
=== Myanmar's Spring Revolution ===
During Myanmar's 2021 protests against the military coup, demonstrators adopted "peopleless protest" tactics to avoid violent crackdowns. They arranged various objects on streets and public places to represent protest formations when in-person gatherings became too dangerous.

=== U.S. Capitol Lawn demonstration ===
In 2020, the organization MoveOn.org planted individualized signs on the West Lawn of the U.S. Capitol representing healthcare workers demanding more personal protective equipment during the COVID-19 pandemic.

=== Fridays for Future protest in Germany ===
The climate activism group Fridays for Future laid down placards in front of the German parliament building as a peopleless demonstration when in-person protests were restricted.

== Comparison to other movements ==
Peopleless protests share similarities with online activism and social media campaigns but differ in their use of physical objects/symbols in public spaces. They aim to bridge online and offline activism.

Unlike traditional protests that rely on large gatherings for impact, peopleless protests can be conducted by dispersed individuals, making them suitable for rural communities or situations where freedom of assembly is restricted.

However, some argue that the lack of physical presence may reduce the perceived threat to authorities compared to mass gatherings, potentially limiting effectiveness.

== See also ==
- Non-violent protests
