= Charlie MacGregor =

Scottish businessman

- Occupation: Entrepreneur
- Known for: Founding The Social Hub (formerly The Student Hotel); Co-founding Movement on the Ground
- Title: Founder and CEO of The Social Hub

Charlie MacGregor is a Scottish entrepreneur and the founder of The Social Hub (formerly The Student Hotel), a hospitality company based in the Netherlands. He is also a co-founder of the refugee charity Movement on the Ground.

== Early career ==
MacGregor began working on building sites at the age of 16. His father had built the first purpose-built student housing for the University of Edinburgh in 1980. At 25, MacGregor bought a small student accommodation company, which he sold ten years later. After a period in London, he moved to Amsterdam in 2003.

== The Social Hub ==
MacGregor founded The Student Hotel in Amsterdam in 2006. The company combines student accommodation, hotel rooms, co-working space and event facilities, and later renamed itself The Social Hub. It has raised funding from investors including Perella Weinberg Real Estate, which invested about €150 million in 2014, and Aermont and APG, which provided €300 million in 2021.

== Movement on the Ground ==
MacGregor is also a co-founder and member of Movement on the Ground, a non-profit foundation responding to the global refugee crisis.

After visiting Lesvos, Greece, in 2015, MacGregor came up with the idea for The Movement Hotel: a temporary hotel run by asylum seekers, as a way for them to gain experience, with profits reinvested to train more refugees.

The hotel was located in Bijlmerbajes prison, a former prison in Amsterdam, and opened in September 2017. In the same building other successful initiatives took place. Refugee Company foundation opened restaurant A Beautiful Mess, which won Entree Awards’ Best off the Grid Award in 2017.

== Tuscany Business Advisor ==
MacGregor is one of the Tuscany Business Advisors, the business leaders who work with the regional government to help secure inward investment to Tuscany
