= Hotspot camp =

Refugee camp on the borders of the European Union

A hotspot camp is a refugee camp designed as the initial reception point for refugees on the borders of the European Union.

== History ==
Originally established in 2015, the intention of the hotspots was to coordinate receiving, identifying, and registering refugees on the external borders of the EU.

In some facilities, people are first identified through personal information by law enforcement personnel, also collecting other data including fingerprints and photos.

== Locations ==
As of 2022, there were five hotspot camps in Greece, on the islands of Chios, Kos, Leros, Lesvos and Samos off the Turkish coast, and five in southern Italy, in Lampedusa, Messina, Pozzallo, Taranto and Trapani.

== See also ==
- Reception and identification centers in Greece

== Bibliography ==
- Lauren Martin, Martina Tazziol, eds., "Governing Mobility Through The European Union's 'Hotspot' Centres: A Forum", Society and Space, 2016
- Alessandra Sciurba, "Categorizing migrants by undermining the right to asylum. The implementation of the 'hotspot approach' in Sicily", Etnografia e ricerca qualitativa 10:1:97-120 (January-April 2017) doi:10.3240/86889 full text
