= Pikpa camp =

Refugee camp near Mytilene, Lesbos, Greece

Pikpa camp or Lesbos Solidarity, was a privately-run refugee camp, located on the Neapoli area near Mytilene, Lesbos. It had a capacity of 100-120 people, though it hosted hundreds more during times of acute need. Its aim was to support the most vulnerable refugees who pass through Mytilene: families with children, the disabled, women who are pregnant, and the injured. The camp focused on humanitarian aid and on providing for the various needs of refugees, including food, medical assistance, clothing, and psychological support.

== History ==
The site of the PIKPA village was originally a children's summer camp. In 2012 it was transformed by the Lesvos Solidarity Network (and with the help of local authorities) into "The Village of Altogether"—a safe haven for vulnerable refugees.

In 2016, Lesvos Solidarity registered as an NGO to further organize resources following the growing refugee crisis on Lesbos arising from the March 2016 EU-Turkey agreement. That same year, the UN Refugee Agency recognized a leader of the Pikpa Camp, Efi Latsoudi, with its Nansen Refugee Award.

On 29 October 2020, its threatened sudden closure was at the last minute postponed, although the authorities stated that it would be closed "as soon as possible". The next day the closure was enforced, and occupants were transferred to the "old" Kara Tepe Refugee Camp.

== See also ==
Other refugee camps on Lesbos:

- Moria Refugee Camp
- Kara Tepe Refugee Camp
