= The Social Hub =

Hotel chain

- Formerly: The Student Hotel (2012–2022)
- Type: Private
- Industry: Hospitality
- Founded: 2012
- Founder: Charlie MacGregor
- Headquarters: Amsterdam, Netherlands
- Number of locations: 21
- Website: www.thesocialhub.co

The Social Hub is a European hospitality company that operates a chain of hybrid hotels combining short- and long-stay accommodation with student housing, coworking spaces, and public amenities. Headquartered in Amsterdam, the company was founded in 2012 by Charlie MacGregor and operated under the name The Student Hotel until 2022.

As of 2026, the company operates 21 properties across cities in the Netherlands, Spain, Germany, Italy, the United Kingdom, France, Portugal, and Austria.

== History ==
=== Founding and early growth ===
The Student Hotel was founded in 2012 by Scottish entrepreneur Charlie MacGregor, who grew up in Edinburgh. MacGregor's father had worked in purpose-built student accommodation in Scotland, and MacGregor entered the property industry at 17 without attending university. The company's first property opened in Rotterdam that year.

In 2014, the company received €150 million (£118 million) in funding from Perella Weinberg Real Estate. The following year, APG Asset Management invested €100 million. In 2016, the company acquired Carlyle Group's 85% stake in three Amsterdam properties.

By 2018, the company had announced five further properties as part of its European expansion.

=== Rebranding ===
In 2022, The Student Hotel rebranded as The Social Hub. That same year, APG Asset Management and GIC acquired a substantial stake from Aermont Capital in a transaction that valued the company at €2.1 billion.

=== Recent developments ===
In 2019, the company secured €82 million in green financing for its Toulouse and Paris properties, linked to environmental, social, and governance (ESG) targets. In 2023, The Social Hub completed a €566 million refinancing facility with Aareal Bank and Rabobank under a green loan finance framework.

The Glasgow property, which opened in April 2024, was the company's first in the United Kingdom. It represented a £90 million investment and contains approximately 500 rooms and 200 coworking spaces.

The Social Hub obtained B Corporation certification in 2024.

In February 2025, the company opened its second Florence property, a €150 million, 550-room complex in the San Jacopino neighbourhood. The following month, The Social Hub entered the Portuguese market with a €60 million property in Porto's Bonjardim district, its first to include long-stay apartments.

In March 2025, the company opened a €114 million property in Rome's San Lorenzo district, converting a disused 1920s railway customs house into a 24,000 square metre complex comprising a hotel, coworking spaces, event venues, and a public park.

== Business model ==
The Social Hub operates as an owner-operator of properties that combine hotel rooms, student accommodation, coworking and meeting spaces, restaurants, bars, gyms, and publicly accessible areas including public parks. The company reports operating more than 10,000 rooms across its portfolio.

== Locations ==
The company's 21 properties are located in: Amsterdam (two properties), Barcelona, Berlin, Bologna, Delft, Eindhoven, Florence (two properties), Glasgow, Groningen, Maastricht, Madrid, Paris, Porto, Rome, Rotterdam, San Sebastián, The Hague, Toulouse, and Vienna.

== Social impact programmes ==
In 2024, the company established the TSH Talent Foundation, a nonprofit funded by a pledge of 1% of annual global revenues. The foundation's stated activities include university scholarship partnerships and a professional development programme called the Better Society Academy.

The company has developed publicly accessible parks at its Rome and Florence Belfiore properties in collaboration with local municipalities. According to Green Street News, the two parks were part of a €260 million investment in Italy.

== Recognition ==
As The Student Hotel, the company received the Worldwide Hospitality Awards' Best Innovation Hotel Individual Initiative in 2014 and The Class Foundation's Best in Class Award for Best New Student Housing Development in 2017. The Student Hotel Maastricht was nominated for the 2018 Frame Awards' Best Use of Colour.

Following its rebranding, the company was profiled by the Financial Times in 2024. The TSH Talent Foundation received The Class Foundation's Best in Class Award for Best Affordable Housing Initiative in 2024. The Social Hub Glasgow received the Scottish Property Awards' Property of the Year for Commercial Buildings in 2025.

== Financing ==
The Social Hub's growth has been backed by private equity and institutional investment. Key investors have included Perella Weinberg Real Estate, APG Asset Management, GIC, and the Carlyle Group. The company was valued at €2.1 billion following the 2022 investment by APG and GIC.

In 2023, the company refinanced €566 million under a green loan finance framework with Aareal Bank and Rabobank. For its Italian properties, the company secured €145 million in financing from UniCredit and a €54 million green guarantee from SACE.

== See also ==
- B Corporation (certification)
- Coworking
- Student housing
