= Lebenslaute =

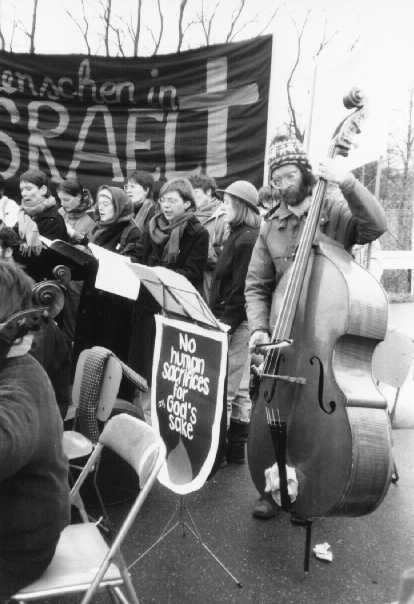
Concert of "Lebenslaute" music group in front of the US military Air Force base, at Frankfurt-am-Main, Germany, against Gulf War, on 26 January 1991

Lebenslaute (motto: "classical music – political action") is an open direct action group that combines concerts of classical music with civil disobedience, mostly by open-air protest concerts in unexpected locations. lebenslaute organizes several nonviolence performances per year on both national and regional levels in Germany.

In 2014, lebenslaute was awarded the renowned Peace Prize of Aachen, Germany, together with the American organization Code Pink – Women for Peace. It is awarded in the Aula Carolina in the city of Aachen each year on 1 September, the date on which International Day of Peace is celebrated in Germany, warningly commemorating the day on which Nazi Germany started World War II by invading Poland on 1 September 1939.

Since 1986, lebenslaute has been turning up in places where classical concerts are least expected, with group sizes between three and over one hundred and in professional black outfit. Locations are chosen in the eye of by-laws that would prohibit any activity of this kind in this spot, so political confrontation is consciously sought. Where possible, lebenslaute gives support to and cooperates with local civil disobedience groups. Direct action is deployed in places that are threatening to people or that design and manufacture objects used for killing, with the aim to protest against the official function of such organizations and locations in principle and in practise: any government agency where people are threatened, e.g. refugees, any business of the arms industry, any airport or prison used for deportation, any nuclear power plant, any military base and any other location that may have the aim of preparing for or conducting warfare.

Every lebenslaute activity is prepared in groups and decisions are taken accordance in Grassroots democracy. Nonviolence as a principle is followed inside the groups, too: None of the activists is asked to do more than they want to. In case of legal proceedings following suit, individuals can be sure to be shown solidarity by other group members and by the group itself in cooperation with allied organizations.

The first political action by lebenslaute took place in 1986 when a huge classical orchestra blocked the entrance to the US military base of Pershing II ballistic missiles near the town of Mutlangen in a rural area of Baden-Württemberg, South-Western Germany.
