= Shop-in =

Protest tactic

Shop-ins were a form of public protest used briefly in 1964 as part of the Civil rights movement.

Demonstrators would enter a store posing as customers, pile a basket or trolley high with groceries, take them through the checkout and then refuse to pay, leaving the goods piled at the checkout. The tactic was used primarily by the Congress of Racial Equality to protest against Lucky Stores hiring policies. Their 1964 protest ended after a meeting between CORE members and Lucky Stores' representatives, chaired by San Francisco mayor John Shelley.

The tactic was denounced by some civil rights organisations, such as the Baptist Ministers' Union.
