= Moria refugee camp =

Refugee camp in Greece

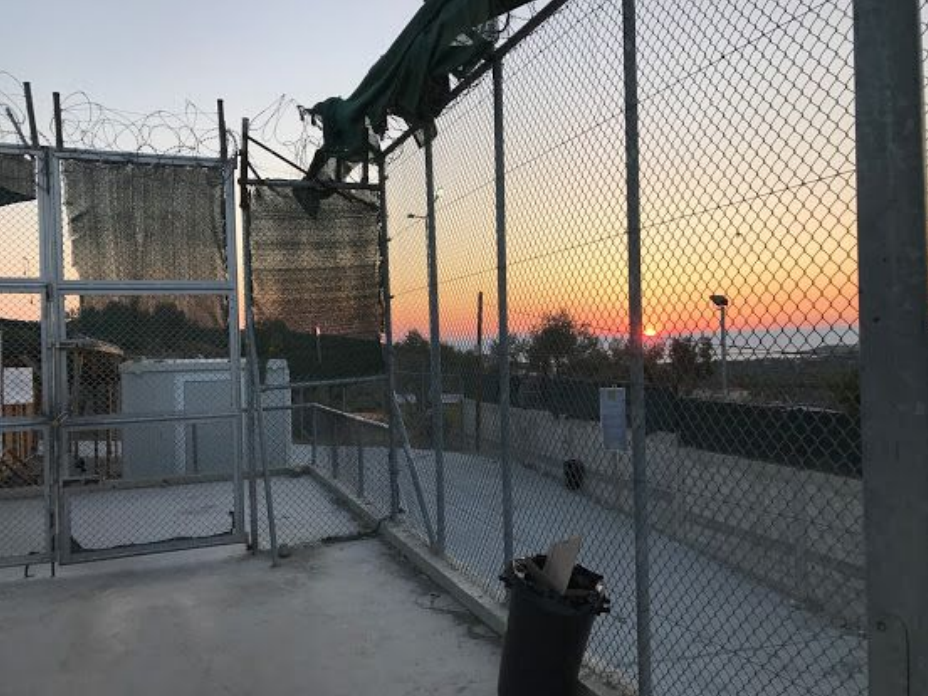
Moria in 2017

Mória Reception and Identification Centre (Greek: Κέντρο Υποδοχής και Ταυτοποίησης Μόριας), better known as Mória Refugee Camp, or just "Mória", was founded in January 2013 and served as the largest refugee camp in Europe until it was burned down in September 2020. It was located outside the village of Moria (Greek: Μόρια, Mória) near Mytilene on the island of Lesbos. Enclosed with barbed wire and a chain-link fence, the military camp served as a European Union “hotspot”. It was described by Human Rights Watch as an open air prison.

== History ==
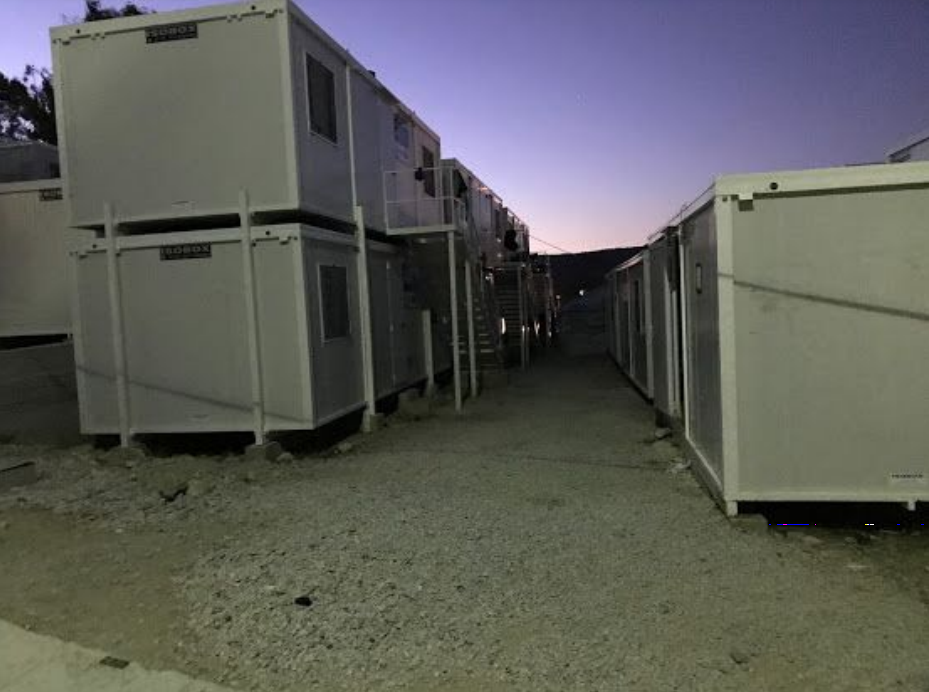
Housing for asylum seekers

In August 2018, it was dubbed by the field coordinator of Doctors Without Borders as "the worst refugee camp on earth", as reported by the BBC. "I've never seen the level of suffering we are witnessing here every day", says Luca Fontana, MSF Lesbos coordinator (7'42). The camp was built to accommodate around 3,000 people, however there were around 20,000 people living in the camp in summer 2020, among whom 6,000 to 7,000 were children under the age of 18.

Because of overcrowding, the camp expanded into a nearby olive grove, known as "Moria jungle", where the living quarters were makeshift, typically made out of pallets and tarps. The migrants cut down an estimated 5,000 olive trees, some of them centuries old, to use as firewood. The residents of the nearby village of Moria have complained of increased criminality, including break-ins, vandalism, and looting of houses.

Visited in 2019, the camp was described as a "concentration camp on European soil" by Jean Ziegler, vice-chairman of the committee of experts advising the UN Human Rights Council. Pope Francis also referred to the camp as a concentration camp.

== Fires ==
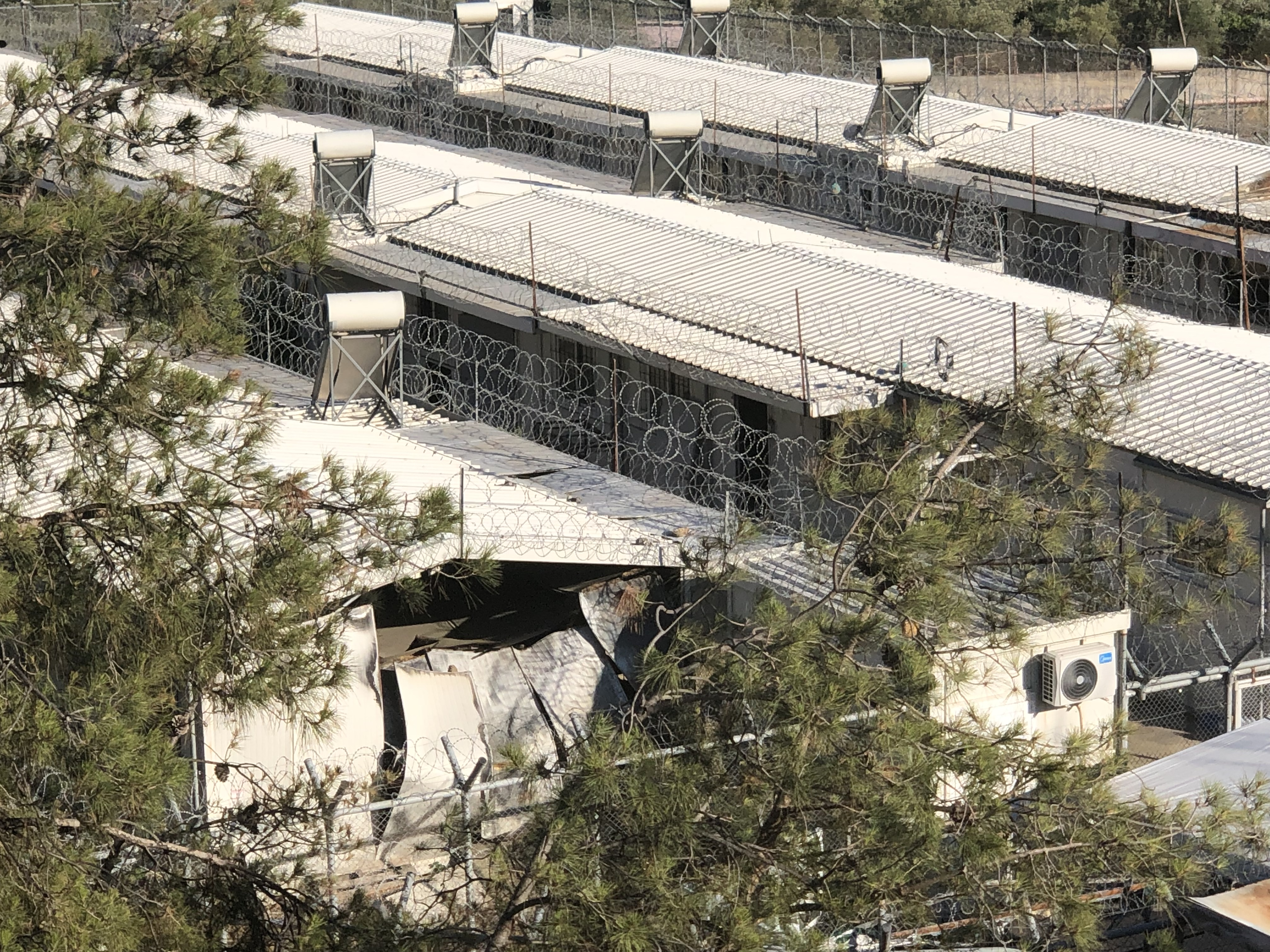
Moria Camp, Lesvos Greece. Accommodation Blocks (After Closure, 2022) Photo - James O'Leary

On 30 September 2019, a fire in the camp killed one Afghan woman who was the wife of the man who would commit the 2023 Lisbon Ismaili Centre stabbings. On 8 September 2020, a fire badly damaged the camp of more than 12,000 asylum seekers. On 10 September, three Greek ships were sent to help shelter the migrants. By then, the camp was almost completely destroyed. Most of the refugees were left homeless on the street. During protests demanding their evacuation Greek police fired tear gas at them.

The Greek government maintains that the fires were started deliberately by migrants protesting that the camp had been put in lockdown due to a COVID-19 outbreak amongst the migrants in the camp. On September 16, 2020, four Afghan men were formally charged with arson for allegedly starting the fire. Two other migrants, both aged 17, which is below the age of full adult criminal responsibility in Greece, were also allegedly involved in starting the fire, and were held in police detention on the mainland. Defence lawyers stated that the following trial had "major procedural violations" including incomplete translations, and that the conviction was based largely on testimony from one witness who did not attend. An investigation by Forensic Architecture based on photos and videos of the spread of the fire found that it was more likely to have been started by improvised electricity supplies in the midst of flammable tent-like housing in a hot, dry environment, and spread by the wind. This was corroborated by a report from the Lesbos fire department.

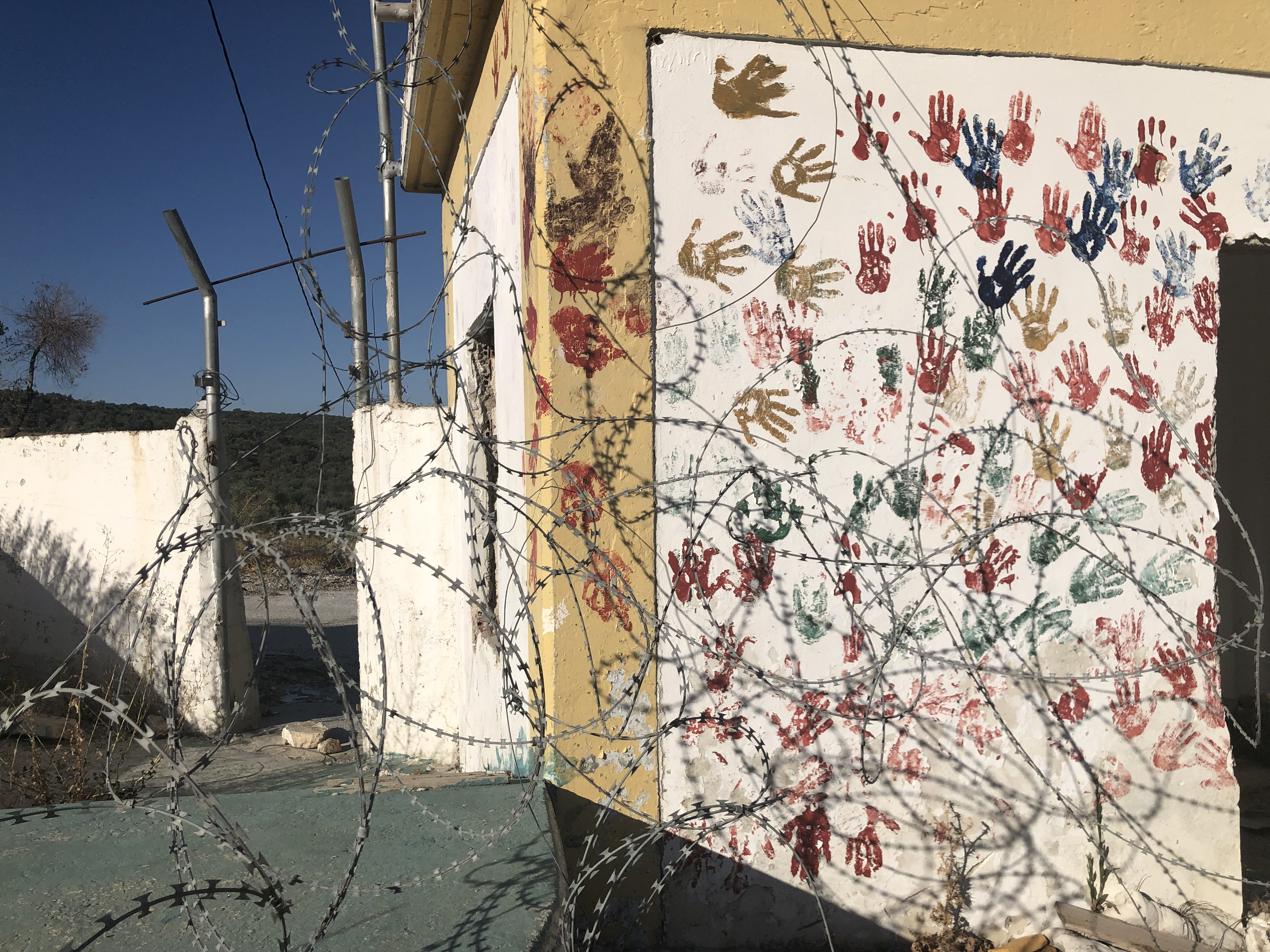
Moria Camp, Lesvos Greece. (After Closure, 2022) Photo - James O'Leary

== Closure ==
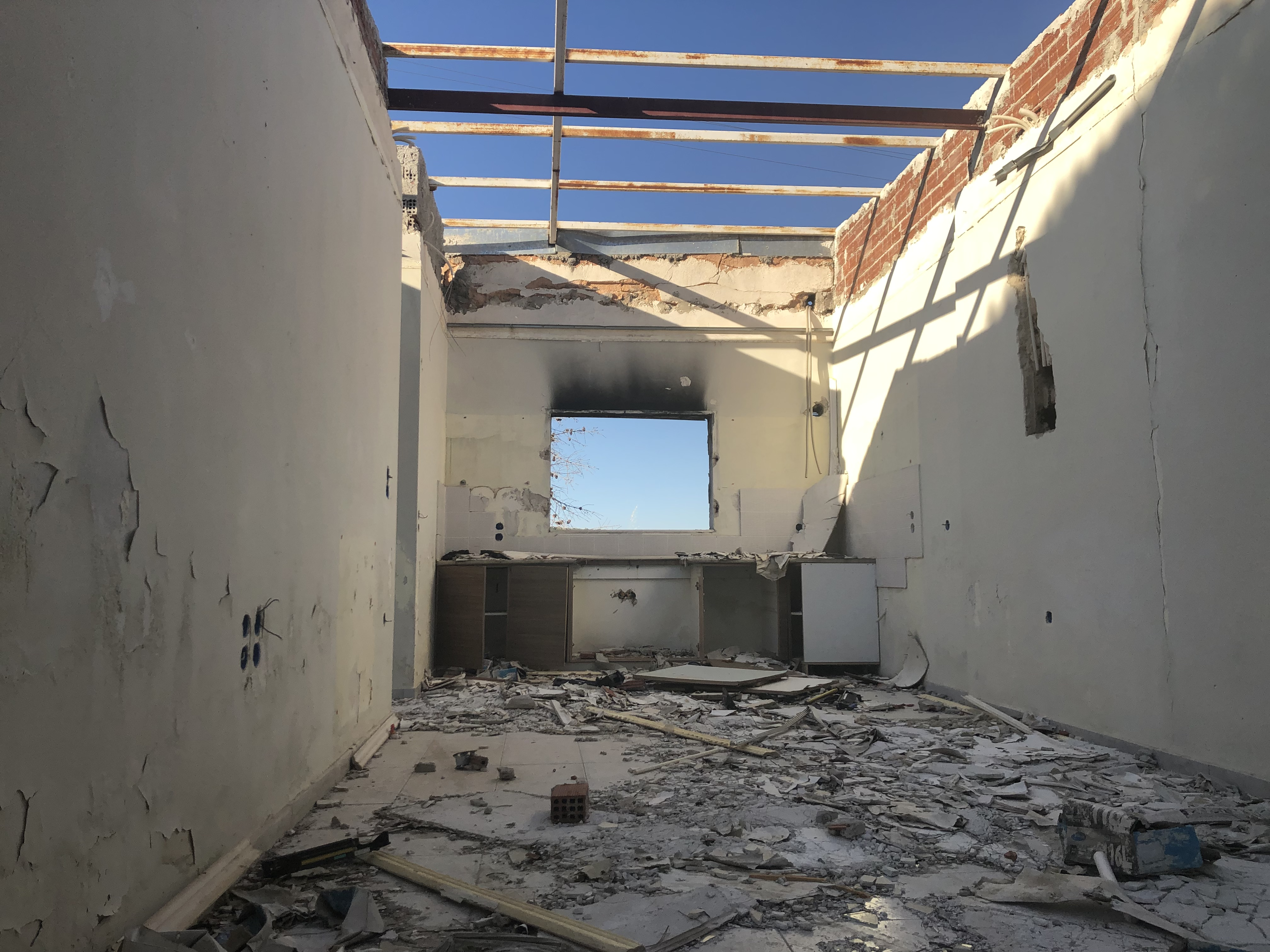
Moria Camp, Lesvos Greece. Room with Fire Damage (After Closure, 2022) Photo - James O'Leary

After the closure of the Moria camp, a temporary facility was rapidly set up at Kara Tepe. A more organised closed reception centre for refugees and asylum seekers was approved to be built by the Greek government with EU approval after the fire destroyed the Moria camp. It will be located at the Vastria area (near the village of Nees Kydonies) in north-east Lesbos and was scheduled be completed by summer 2022. However, the greek Council of State revoked the construction permit, due to a lack of an environmental study, and construction work has since been put on hold.

== See also ==
- Pikpa camp
- Kara Tepe refugee camp
