= Maria of Gothia =

Maria of Gothia was the first wife of David of Trebizond, last Emperor of Trebizond, whom she married in 1426.

== Family ==
Maria of Gothia was a daughter of Alexios I of Theodoro, ruler of the Principality of Theodoro, in Crimea. Theodoro was also known as Gothia because its territory had previously belonged to the Crimean Goths, who had undergone Hellenization under the influence of the Byzantine Empire. Her family were the Gabras.

Alexios I was a son of Stephen of Theodoro, who emigrated to Moscow in 1391 or 1402 along with his son Gregory. Stephen's patronymic suggests he may have been the son of Basil of Theodoro. The relation of Stephen to the first known prince of Theodoro, Demetrios is uncertain, though Demetrios could be his grandfather.

The Goths in the Crimea (1936) by Alexander Vasiliev presented the theory that Demetrios and his successors were descendants of Constantine Gabras, the doux of Trebizond in the early 12th century. Constantine is considered a nephew of Theodore Gabras, the 11th century Duke of Trebizond mentioned in the Alexiad by Anna Komnene. However the exact relation is uncertain; Constantine could also be a younger brother or even son of Theodore.

== Marriage ==
Maria sailed from Gothia, and married David of Trebizond in September 1426 in Trebizond. A report by historian Theodore Spandounes, dated to 1538, names the wife of David as Helena Kantakouzene, the sister of Irene Kantakouzene. Spandounes adds that Helena was visited by her brother George in Trebizond sometime after 1437, which implies Maria may have been dead by that time. On the other hand, based on an epitaph composed by John Eugenikos for her nephew Alexis, who died in Trebizond, Maria's brother John and her nephew Alexis were resident in Trebizond in 1447. It is unlikely they would have remained there after her death and her husband's subsequent remarriage.

Historian Thierry Ganchou has recently asserted that due to discrepancies in Spandounes' accounts, it may be that Helena Kantakouzene had never existed. Ganchou instead suggests that Maria had outlived her husband, and that perhaps the legend of Helena's solitary burial of David and their sons following the Ottoman conquest of Trebizond may instead be assigned to Maria.

== Issue ==
The children of David have been attributed variously to Maria or Helena by various genealogies. They included Basil, Manuel and George Komnenos, princes decapitated by orders of Mehmed II of the Ottoman Empire in 1463. Their sister Anna married first Zagan Pasha, Beglerbeg of Macedonia and secondly to Sinan Beg, son of Ilvan Beg. Another daughter reportedly married Mamia II, Prince of Guria. Cyril Toumanoff gives Maria, a third daughter, as wife of Constantine Mourousis.

== Notes ==
Royal titles
Preceded by Daughter of Dawlat Berdi	Empress consort of Trebizond c. 1438–c. 1459	Succeeded by Helena Kantakouzene
