= Thomas Kantakouzenos =

Byzantine aristocrat

- Died: 25 July 1463
- Noble family: Kantakouzenos

Thomas Kantakouzenos (Greek: Θωμάς Καντακουζηνός, Thomás Kantakouzenós, modern pronunciation Thomás Kantakouzinós, Serbian: Тома Кантакузин/Toma Kantakuzin; died 25 July 1463) was a Byzantine aristocrat, a member of the Kantakouzenos family, who became a Serbian magnate and general that served Despot Đurađ Branković. He was the brother of Irene Kantakouzene, Đurađ's wife.

== Origin ==
The Byzantinist Donald Nicol, who researched the family's history, categorically identifies him as the brother of George Palaiologos Kantakouzenos; Giovanni Musachi makes him the brother of Irene Kantakouzene, wife of Serbian Despot Đurađ Branković, but incorrectly states Thomas was the son of the Emperor John VI Kantakouzenos, an error DuCange repeats. Instead, he is more probably the son of Theodore Kantakouzenos.

== Career ==
He was one of the many Greeks who entered the service of Despot Đurađ Branković following his marriage to Irene Kantakouzene in 1414. Ragusan documents show he was present at the Despot's court in 1433 and 1435. In 1439 he took part in the defense of the Smederevo castle against the Ottoman Turks; historian Doukas records that when the castle fell after a siege of three months, the defenders who subsequently did homage to Sultan Murad II included Branković's son Grgur and Thomas Kantakouzenos. Despite this ceremony, Kantakouzenos carried on the fight on behalf of his brother-in-law, leading the Despot's army to victory over Bosnian king Stephen Thomas on 16 September 1448, which restored Srebrenica and Višegrad to Serbian rule. Four years later, he led another Serbian army that invaded the Principality of Zeta, but was routed on 14 September 1452 by vojvoda Stefan Crnojević.

Despite his position, following Đurađ Branković's death Thomas was unable to shield his sister Irene from the cruelty of her son Lazar. On the night of Irene's death, 3 May 1457, he fled from Smederevo to Ottoman-ruled Adrianople with his niece Mara and his blinded nephew Grgur.

Thomas was summoned to appear in court in Ragusa on 11 August 1459 and 18 March 1462, but Nicol doubts he answered the summons. The Serbian Annals record his death on 25 July 1463, immediately after the fall of the Serbian Despotate to the Ottomans.

== Sources ==
- Nicol, Donald M. (1968). The Byzantine Family of Kantakouzenos (Cantacuzenus), ca. 1100–1460: A Genealogical and Prosopographical Study. Dumbarton Oaks studies 11. Washington, DC: Dumbarton Oaks Center for Byzantine Studies.
- Terzić, Slavenko; Vasić, Milan (1995). Босна и Херцеговина од средњег века до новијег времена: међународни научни скуп 13-15 дец. 1994 (in Serbian). Institute of History Belgrade. ISBN 978-86-7743-007-8.
