= Helena Kantakouzene, Empress of Trebizond =

Second wife of Emperor David of Trebizond

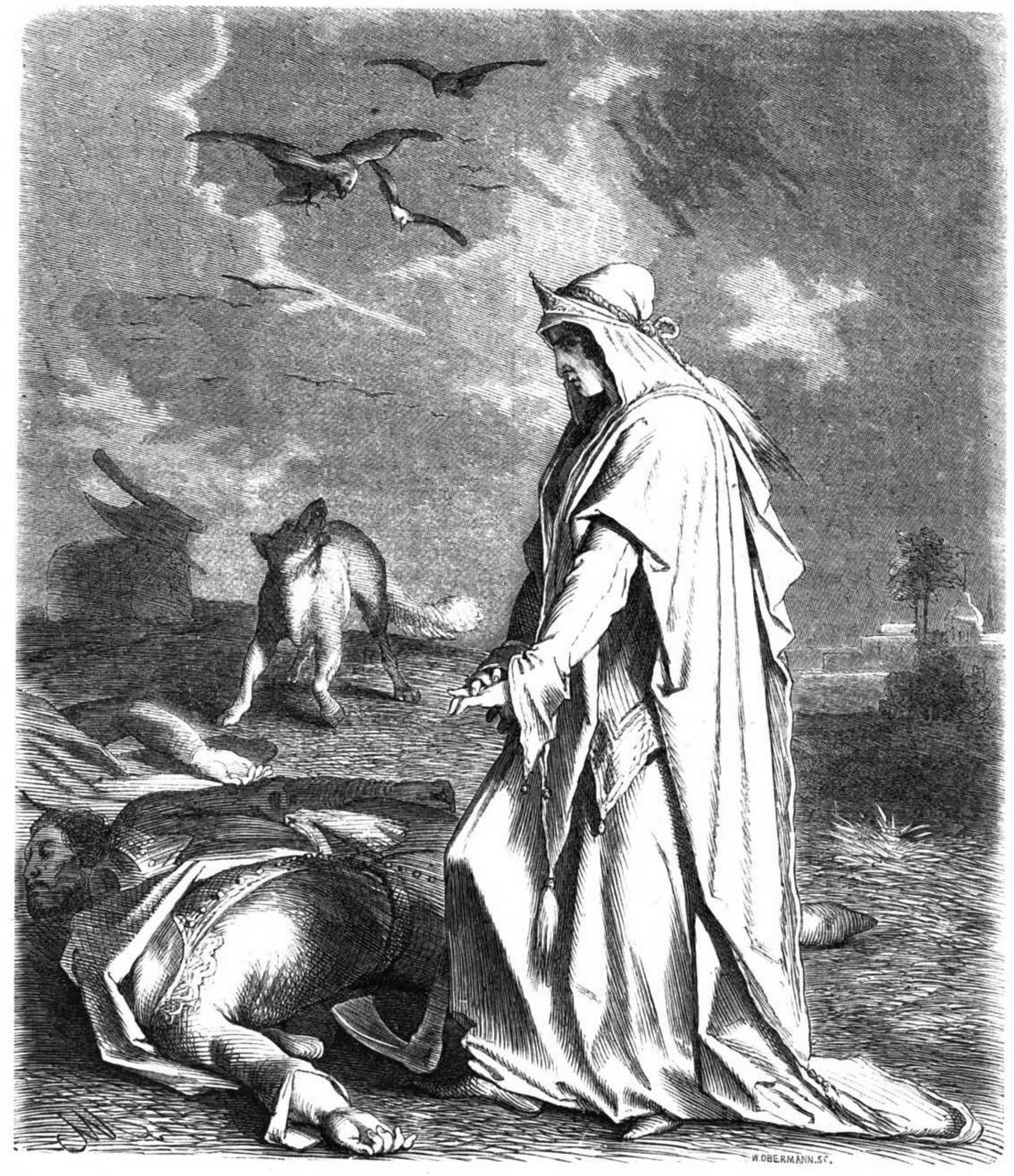
Helena buries her husband's corpse (Ludwig Storch, 1855)

Helena Kantakouzene (died 1463) was the second wife of David of Trebizond, the last Emperor of Trebizond.

== Family ==
Donald Nicol has argued that Helena was the sister of George Palaiologos Kantakouzenos, and thus the granddaughter of Matthew Kantakouzenos and possibly the daughter of Theodore Kantakouzenos. Theodore Spandounes reports that George visited her in Trebizond after 1437.

It is unclear which of David's children were also hers; his five children—three boys and two daughters—have been attributed variously to Helena or David's first wife Maria of Gothia by various genealogies. Nevertheless, the oldest sons died with their father 1 November 1463; the youngest son, George, who was three years old, and the daughter Anna were spared. Spandounes states they were sent as a present to Sultan Uzun Hassan of the Aq Qoyunlu, where George was converted to Islam, but he eventually escaped and abjured to Christianity. Spandounes says the name of the king who sheltered George Kantakouzene and gave him his daughter in marriage was named "Gurguiabei", which has been interpreted as a king of Georgia (and either George VIII or Constantine II), or "Guria Bey", ruler of Guria. Anna's fate is less clear. The historian Laonikos Chalkokondyles contradicts Spandounes, writing that after being "summoned to his bedchamber", Anna was married to Zagan Pasha; however, when he learned Zagan attempted to force her to become a Muslim, Mehmet separated them. A local tradition connects Anna to a village south of Trabizon called "Lady Village", where in 1870 an inscription bearing Anna's name was seen in the village church dedicated to the Archangels.

== Empress ==
On 15 August 1461, Mehmed II of the Ottoman Empire forced Emperor David to surrender his throne in return for a pension. David and his family were settled on estates near Serres in the Struma valley, comprising an annual income of some 300,000 pieces of silver. Although Helena presumably was with him, Donald Nicol mentions a source which states David had sent her to refuge with the Georgian prince Mamia of Guria prior to Mehmed's arrival before the walls of Trebizond. After two years, his former retainer George Amiroutzes accused David of conspiring against Mehmed, and the former emperor was executed with all but one of his sons.

According to Spandounes, Helena survived her husband and sons. The Sultan reportedly had ordered their corpses to be left exposed outside the Walls of Constantinople. When she dug the graves with her own hands and buried them, she was condemned to pay a fine of 15,000 ducats or be executed herself. Her retainers raised the money, but Helena dressed in sackcloth and lived out her days in a straw hut near the corpses of her dead family.

== Historicity ==
The historian Thierry Ganchou advanced the theory that Helena had not actually existed, being instead the result of the confusion between David's mother Theodora Kantakouzene and his wife Maria of Gothia by the historian Theodore Spandounes. Ganchou refers to the historical writings of Angelo Massarelli, the Papal Secretary to the Council of Trent, (Note: Medieval genealogist Lindsay Brook believed that Massarelli may have had access to Vatican archival material (which has since remained unexamined or lost) when compiling his histories) which state that Theodora was the daughter of Theodore Kantakouzenos. This identification is also reinforced by the historian George Sphrantzes, who refers to Theodora's other son John IV as a cousin to Mara Branković, herself a granddaughter of Theodore. However, as Theodore is also commonly identified as the father of Helena, this would result in the extremely unlikely scenario where Helena had married her own nephew. In addition to this, given that Theodore had died in 1410, Helena would have been at least fifty years old at the birth of her youngest child. This birth year would also have required that David's first wife Maria, whom he had married either in 1426 or 1429, die very quickly afterwards in order for Helena to have still been young enough to be available for marriage.

Given that the only contemporary source which mentions Helena is Spandounes, Ganchou posits that these discrepancies can be explained by the fact that Spandounes had unintentionally invented her. Ganchou believes that Spandounes (who was a descendant of the Kantakouzenos) was aware that a member of the house had married an emperor of Trebizond, but that he had not known her name, nor that of the emperor. (Note: This would be similar to his contemporary Hugues Busac, another relative of the family, who had also mentioned the marriage, but had failed to clarify the identities of the couple.) It may be that he had assumed that the emperor in question was the final ruler of the kingdom and then, given that the name Helena appears frequently among the Kantakouzenos, assigned it to the unnamed wife. This was something that the historian had done elsewhere in his works, when he mistakenly also referred to Irene of Serbia, another daughter of Theodore, as Helena. Ganchou then concludes that since there is no known death date for Maria of Gothia, it may have been her who had outlived David and performed the famous burial.

== Notes ==
Royal titles
Preceded by Maria of Gothia	Empress consort of Trebizond c. 1459–c. 1461	Ottoman conquest
