= Siege of Smederevo (1439) =

Part of the Ottoman conquest of the Balkans

- Part of the Serbian–Ottoman wars
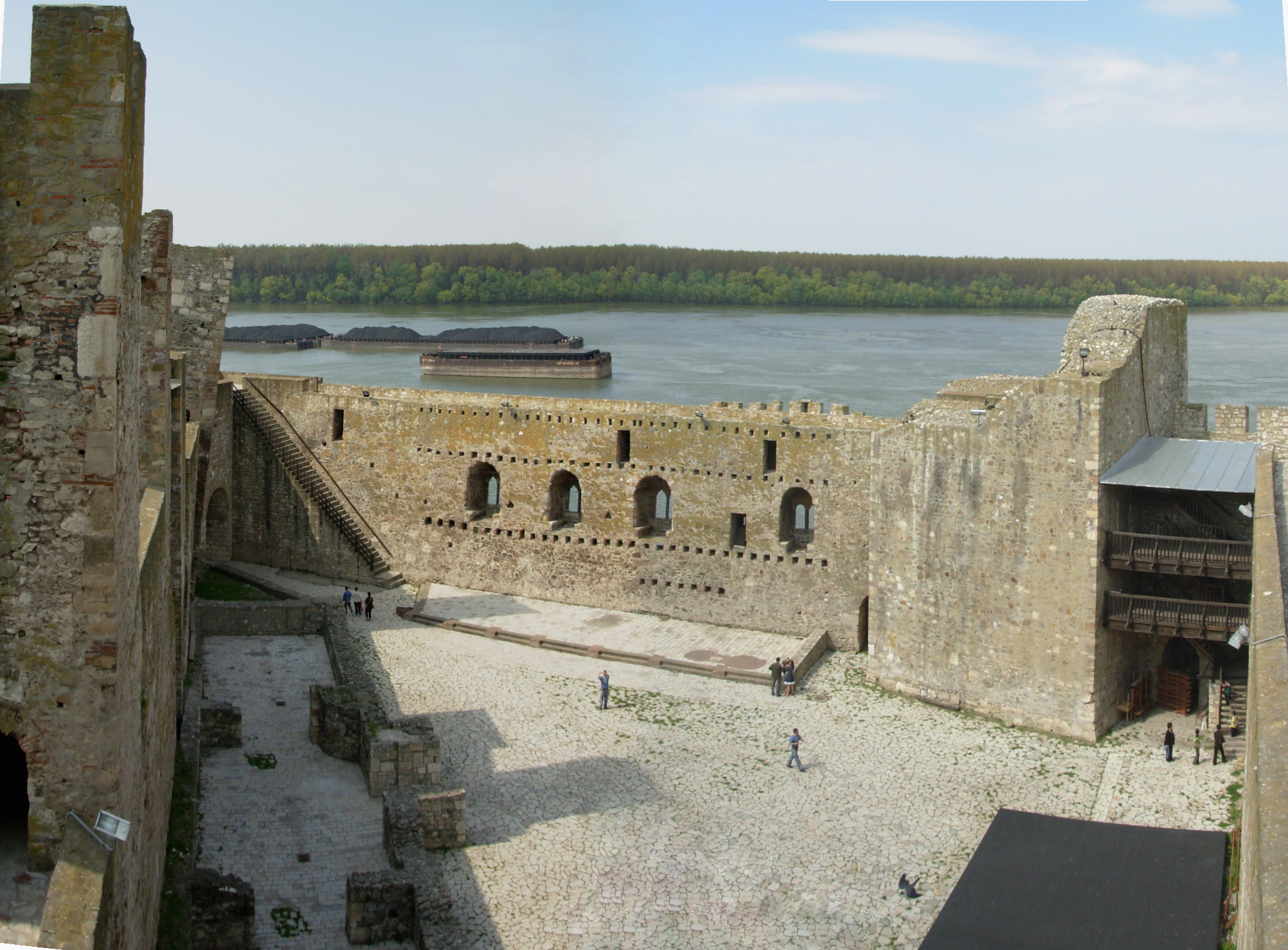
- View of the Small Town (Mali Grad) of the Smederevo Fortress
Date	Early June – 18 August 1439
Location	Smederevo, Serbian Despotate
Result	Ottoman victory: Fall of the Serbian Despotate

Belligerents
Ottoman Empire	Serbian Despotate

Commanders and leaders
(Ottoman Empire) Murad II	Grgur Branković; Thomas Kantakouzenos

Strength
Unknown	Unknown

Casualties and losses
Unknown	Unknown

The fall of Smederevo was the Ottoman capture of the capital of the Serbian Despotate on 18 August 1439. Ottoman forces led by Sultan Murad II besieged Smederevo from early June, defended by Grgur Branković and Thomas Kantakouzenos. After a three-month siege and continuous artillery bombardment, the starving garrison surrendered. The fall of the city brought the temporary end of the Serbian Despotate. Following the Ottoman-Hungarian war of 1443–1444, Despot Đurađ Branković (who had fled to Hungary after the Ottoman conquest) agreed to a peace treaty with Sultan Murad II, signed on 15 August 1444, which allowed the Serbian Despotate to be restored under his rule.
