= Anna Komnene (disambiguation) =

Anna Komnene or Comnena (Greek: Ἄννα Κομνηνὴ) may refer to:

- Anna Komnene (1 December 1083 – 1153), daughter of Alexios I Komnenos
- Anna Komnene Angelina (c. 1176 – 1212), Empress of Nicaea
- Anna Komnene Doukaina (d. 4 January 1286), known in French as Agnes, Princess-consort of the Principality of Achaea
- Anna Komnene (daughter of David of Trebizond) (1447 – after 1463)
- Anna Megale Komnene (6 April 1357 - after 30 November 1406), Queen consort of Georgia
