= Andronikos Kantakouzenos =

Andronikos Kantakouzenos may refer to:

- Andronikos Palaiologos Kantakouzenos (died 1453), Byzantine statesman
- Andronikos Kantakouzenos (1553–1601), Ottoman and Wallachian statesman
