= Theodore Spandounes =

16th-century Greek historian

Theodore Spandounes (Greek: Θεόδωρος Σπανδούνης; Italian: Teodoro Spandugino) was an early 16th-century Greek historian of noble Byzantine extraction; the son of exiles fleeing the Ottoman conquest of Byzantium who had settled in Venice, Italy. As a youth he stayed with relatives in Ottoman-ruled Macedonia and visited the Ottoman capital at Constantinople, acquiring a knowledge of their history and culture. In later life he served successive Popes as a counsellor and repeatedly advocated the dispatch of a new Crusade against the Ottomans. His chief legacy is his Italian-language history on the origins of the Ottoman state and its history up to that time, whose first version was published in 1509 in Italian and was soon translated into French. Spandounes continued working on it, with the final version appearing in 1538. The work is disorganized and contains errors, but is extremely valuable as a historical source for its wealth of information.

== Family and origin ==
Theodore Spandounes was most probably born in Venice, the son of Matthew Spandounes and Eudokia Kantakouzene. His father was a Greek soldier who entered the service of the Venetian Republic as a stradioti mercenary, and for unspecified exploits was made a count of the Holy Roman Empire and imperial knight by Emperor Frederick III in 1454. He was also given a grant of land around the town of Loidoriki in Greece. This was a nominal grant meant as a gesture of honour, since the territory in question was under Ottoman control, but according to historian Donald Nicol it is possibly indicative of Matthew's and his family's place of origin. On the other hand, both Spandounes and other members of the family still remaining in the Ottoman-ruled Balkans claimed descent from Constantinople itself, while some had settled in Venice as early as the 1370s. Theodore's mother was a descendant of the Kantakouzenoi, one of the most notable late Byzantine aristocratic lines, which had produced a number of emperors as well as rulers of the Despotate of the Morea in the Peloponnese. Apart from Theodore, the couple had at least two more children: a daughter, who married the Venetian citizen Michael Trevisan, and a son, Alexander, who became a merchant.

Through his mother, Theodore had relatives among the powerful Christian families of the late Byzantine/early Ottoman era. His mother was the grand-daughter of George Palaiologos Kantakouzenos. George was a cousin of the last two Byzantine emperors, John VIII Palaiologos and Constantine XI Palaiologos, while his sisters Irene and Helena married the Serbian Despot Đurađ Branković and the Emperor of Trebizond David respectively, another sister became the wife of King George VIII of Georgia, while one of George's daughters, Anna, married Vladislav Hercegović, Duke of Saint Sava. The Spandounes family also had influential members in the early Ottoman Balkans, most notably the wealthy merchant Loukas Spandounes in Thessalonica, who on his death in 1481 was buried in a splendid, Italianate (and probably built in and transported all the way from Venice) tomb in Hagios Demetrios. Although Theodore too had dealings with Thessalonica, however, he does not mention Loukas.

== Life and work ==
Theodore's mother died sometime before 1490, and his father sent Theodore, then still a child, to live with his great-aunt, Mara Branković. Mara was the daughter of Đurađ and Irene, who had been taken as one of the wives of the Ottoman Sultan Murad II. After Murad's death in 1451, Mara was allowed by her stepson Sultan Mehmed II, to retire to her estate at Ježevo, where she "maintained a privileged and protected enclave of Christian faith" (Nicol). It was in this "exalted and privileged" environment that Theodore was brought up, and it was there that he learned to speak some Turkish and acquired first-hand knowledge of Turkish customs and history. In 1503, he visited the Ottoman capital of Constantinople to aid his brother Alexander, who had been brought to financial ruin by the recently concluded Ottoman–Venetian war and the Ottomans' confiscation of Venetian goods. Upon his arrival, he found that his brother had died in the meantime. From 1509, he was forced to leave Venice and live in exile in France. It was during this exile that he composed the first draft of his history, which he dedicated to King Louis XII. This first version was translated into French by Balarin de Raconis in 1519, and was published in a modern edition in 1896 by C. H. A. Schéfer.

A devout but not dogmatic Christian, Spandounes was more attuned to Italian Renaissance humanism than religion. Conscious of his imperial Byzantine heritage, he was still "not unduly bigoted" against the Turks, having lived among them and come to know them. Nevertheless, the main aim of his work was to alert Western Christendom to the Turkish menace and rally it to a crusade to liberate his homeland. Despite 19th-century attempts to claim Spandounes for Greek nationalism, however, his cause was not limited to the Greek-speaking lands: Spandounes used the term "Greece" for the entirety of Europe, juxtaposed to Asia (perhaps echoing the Turkish division of largely Christian Rumelia from predominantly Muslim Anatolia), and saw himself as a defender of all of Christian Europe, not simply in the service of a particular nation. Although he remained an Orthodox Christian, Spandounes turned to the Roman Catholic Church for aid, and served as advisor and confidante to several Popes who would champion his cause, starting with Leo X (1513–21), for whom he prepared the second draft of his work in 1519. He fell out with Leo's successor, Pope Hadrian VI, who not only showed no interest in the war against the Turks, but also cut his family's pension, but resumed his position under Clement VII (1523–34) and Paul III (1534–49). In 1538 he produced the third and final version of his work, which he presented (in a French translation), to the French Dauphin, the future King Henry II of France. This version was published at Lucca in 1550 and—with many errors—at Florence in 1551, reprinted in 1654, and formed the basis for the first modern edition by the Greek scholar Konstantinos Sathas in 1890.

Spandounes seems to have based his work on oral or documentary material available to him and his family, as well as unspecified "Turkish annals", but it is impossible to say which. There is notably almost no reference to the other post-1453 Greek historians, which as Nicol notes is possibly due to the fact that their works were not disseminated in printed form until much later. Likewise there is little to suggest that he knew and made use of the handful of Italian treatises on the Turks that were written at about the same time, except for the works of Marin Barleti, whom Spandounes mentions by name.

== Sources ==
- Nicol, Donald M., ed. (1997). Theodore Spandounes: On the Origins of the Ottoman Emperors. Cambridge University Press. ISBN 0-521-58510-4.
- Trapp, Erich; Walther, Rainer; Beyer, Hans-Veit; Sturm-Schnabl, Katja (1981). Prosopographisches Lexikon der Palaiologenzeit (in German). Vol. 5. Vienna: Verlag der Österreichischen Akademie der Wissenschaften. ISBN 3-7001-3003-1.
