= Demetrios Palaiologos Kantakouzenos =

Mesazon of John VIII and Constantine XI

Demetrios Palaiologos Kantakouzenos (Greek: Δημήτριος Παλαιολόγος Καντακουζηνός; fl. 1420-1453) was the mesazon (chief minister) of the emperors John VIII Palaiologos and his brother, Constantine XI. His colleague in the office as mesazon was Loukas Notaras.

Demetrios first appears in history as one of the courtiers who advised John VIII to support the Ottoman prince Mustafa in his bid to seize control of the Ottoman Empire on the death of his brother Mehmet I in 1421. When Mehmet's son Murat emerged as the victor, he was selected as one of the envoys (the other two being Matthew Laskaris and Angelos Philomattes) to meet with Murat. The Sultan showed his annoyance that the Byzantines had supported his uncle by putting them in prison; none of them were released until the conclusion of a treaty between John VIII and Murat in February 1424.

He played other prominent roles in diplomatic affairs as mesazon to the two emperors. He was a witness to John's treaties with the Republic of Venice in September 1423, May 1431, October 1436, September 1442, and July 1447. He also played a heroic part in the final defense of Constantinople; according to Donald Nicol, he commanded a unit of 700 men stationed in the neighborhood of the Church of the Holy Apostles with his son-in-law Nikephoros Palaiologos, while Steven Runciman assigns him to a command of a portion of the Theodosian Walls next to the Sea of Marmora.

Demetrios' fate following the fall of Constantinople to Sultan Mehmet II's army is unclear. Du Cange writes that he and his son-in-law were killed defending the city; Steven Runciman writes that Demetrios was captured alive. Donald Nicol notes that a Demetrios Kantakouzenos is recorded as escaping from the fallen city, with his family and other refugees, on the ship of the Genoese admiral Zorzi Doria. Doria took them as far as Chios, where the Venetian captain Thomas Celsi gave them passage to Candia (modern Heraklion) in Crete. Nicol also mentions the record of the daughter of "one Demetrios Kantakouzenos and his wife Simonis Gadelina, called Maria" marrying Theodore, the son of Paul Palaiologos, in Corfu in November 1486.

Nicol offers no information on the names of Demetrios Palaiologos Kantakouzenos' parents, although he states that Demetrios was the cousin of Emperor John VIII. The name of his wife has not come down to us, although he had a daughter who, as mentioned above, married Nikephoros Palaiologos, and Demetrios is presumed to be the father of a protostrator Kantakouzenos who was executed along with Loukas Notaras and Andronikos Palaiologos Kantakouzenos five days after the capture of the city.

== Sources ==
- Nicol, Donald M. (1968). The Byzantine Family of Kantakouzenos (Cantacuzenus), ca. 1100–1460: A Genealogical and Prosopographical Study. Dumbarton Oaks studies 11. Washington, DC: Dumbarton Oaks Center for Byzantine Studies.
