= Andronikos Palaiologos Kantakouzenos =

Byzantine nobleman, Grand Domestic, son of Demetrios I Kantakouzenos

Andronikos Palaiologos Kantakouzenos (died 4 June 1453) was the last Grand Domestic of the Byzantine Empire. Present in the city at the Fall of Constantinople in 1453, he was one of the group of high Imperial officials executed by Ottoman Sultan Mehmet II five days after the city was taken.

Andronikos was amongst those who advised Emperor Constantine XI Palaiologos to take for his third wife Anna, the daughter of Emperor David of Trebizond, instead of Mara, the daughter of Đurađ Branković, despot of Serbia. His name appears on the treaty between Byzantium and Venice concluded in April 1448, in place of Demetrios Palaiologos Kantakouzenos, who was indisposed at the time.

He is likely the Grand Domestic Kantakouzenos whom Emperor John VIII Palaiologos sent in the fall of 1436 to persuade the Serbians to send a delegation to the Council of Ferrara-Florence concerning the Union of Churches. The historian Sylvester Syropoulos describes this man as the "brother-in-law of the Despot of Serbia"; Andronikos Palaiologos Kantakouzenos was the brother of Irene Kantakouzene, wife of Đurađ Branković. The Serbian church refused to participate in this council, and if the identification is correct, it could explain Andronikos' motivation for opposing marriage between Emperor Constantine and Mara Branković.

== Family ==
According to the genealogy of his wife Hugues Busac compiled, he was the brother of George Palaiologos Kantakouzenos, and with George possibly son of Demetrios I Kantakouzenos or his brother Theodore Kantakouzenos. He was married and had at least one son who married the daughter of the megas doux Loukas Notaras. Doukas tells how the younger Kantakouzenos was accompanied by his father-in-law to their execution.
