= Irene Kantakouzene =

Wife of Serbian despot

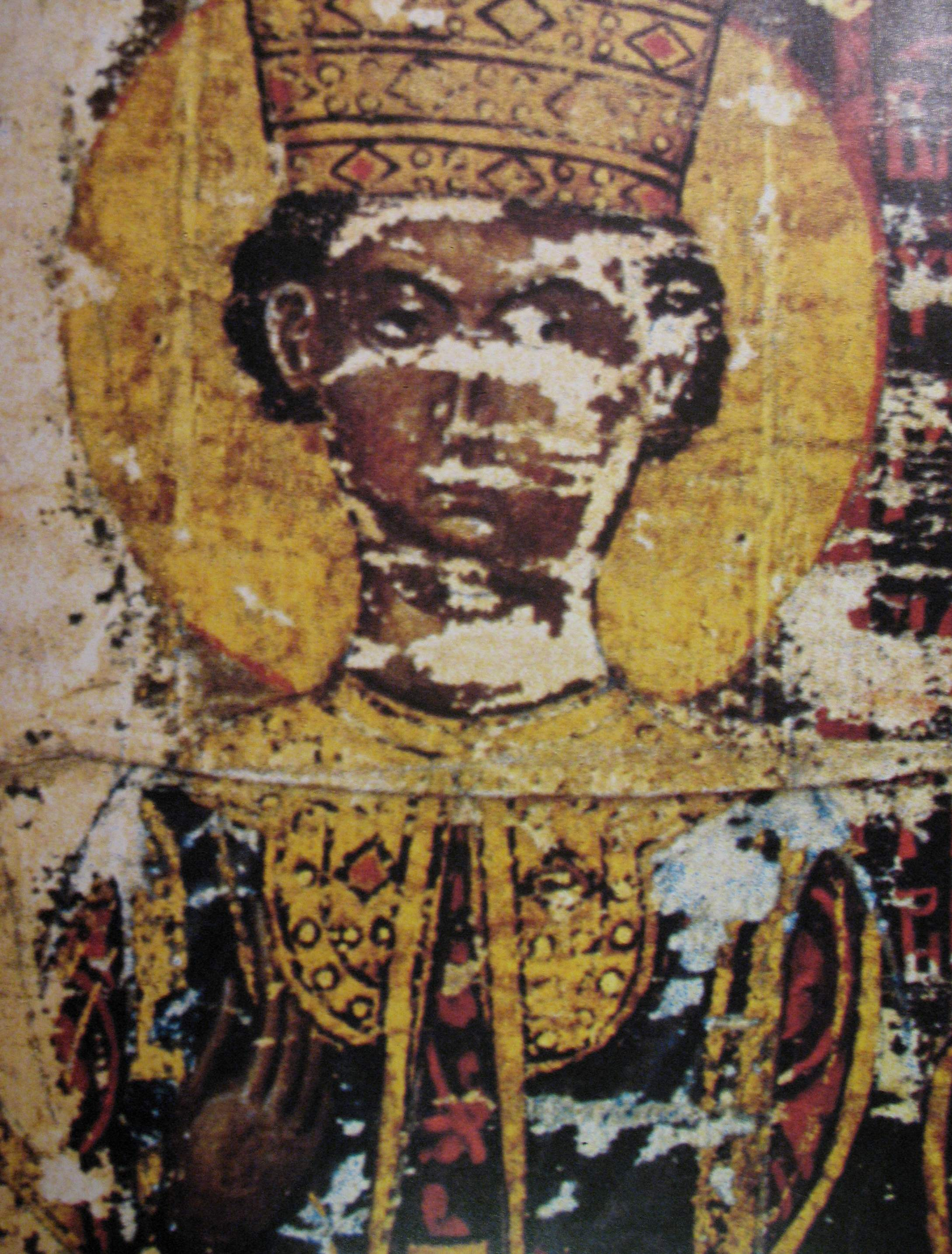

Despotess of Serbia
- Tenure: 19 July 1427 – 24 December 1456
- Born: c. 1400; Constantinople, Byzantine Empire (modern-day Istanbul, Turkey)
- Died: 3 May 1457; Rudnik, Gornji Milanovac, Serbian Despotate (modern-day Serbia)
- Spouses: Đurađ Branković (m. 1414; died 1456)
- Issue: Todor Branković (?); Grgur Branković; Mara Branković; Stefan Branković; Katarina, Countess of Celje; Lazar Branković
- House: Kantakouzenos (birth); Branković (marriage)
- Father: Theodore Kantakouzenos
- Mother: Helena Ouresina Doukaina Nemanjić

Irene Kantakouzene (Greek: Ειρήνη Καντακουζηνή, Eiréne Kantakouzené, modern pronunciation Iríni Kantakouziní [iriˈni kantakusini'], Serbian: Ирина Кантакузин / Irina Kantakuzin; c. 1400 – 3 May 1457), known simply as Despotess Jerina (Serbian: деспотица Јерина / despotica Jerina) was the wife of Serbian Despot Đurađ Branković. Her father was probably the Byzantine nobleman Theodore Kantakouzenos. In Serbian folk legends, she is the founder of many fortresses in Serbia.

== Life ==
Although the Smederevo Fortress was the work of Đurađ Branković (completed in 1430), Irene apparently had a role in its construction; one of its towers is known as "Jerina [Irene]'s Tower" (Serbian: Јеринина кула / Jerinina kula), and she is blamed for causing hardship on the inhabitants of the countryside by levying taxes and recruiting forced labor for building the fortress. The fortress traded hands between the Serbs and the Ottomans over the following years until it fell on 20 June 1459, more than two years after Branković, and then Irene, had died.

Nicols describes the circumstances of Irene's death as "melancholy". According to the account of historian Michael Critobulus, upon the death of Đurađ Branković, his youngest son Lazar became Despot under her regency. However Lazar swiftly deprived her of all authority and treated her so badly that she tried to escape to the court of Sultan Mehmet II with her daughter Mara and her son Grgur (Gregory). Lazar pursued them, and captured Irene although Mara and Gregory successfully escaped. Irene soon became ill and died on the night of 2–3 May at Rudnik, where she was buried. Theodore Spandounes, a 16th-century historian records the accusation that Lazar poisoned her.

== Family ==
Irene was one of the sisters of George Palaiologos Kantakouzenos, according to Spandounes and other sources. The genealogy Donald Nicol had constructed gives George and Irene at least four siblings: Andronikos Palaiologos Kantakouzenos, Thomas Kantakouzenos, Helena Kantakouzene, and one more sister who married a King of Georgia. Although he speculated their father was Demetrios I Kantakouzenos, Nicols was "certain" that their grandfather was Matthew Kantakouzenos and their great-grandfather the Emperor John VI Kantakouzenos. However, Nicol later backed away from this identification of Irene and George's father, instead stating that it is more likely that he was Demetrios' brother Theodore Kantakouzenos.

Irene married Đurađ Branković on 26 December 1414, Irene having come to Serbia from Thessalonika; he would not become Despot of Serbia until 1427, by which time they had been married 13 years. No contemporary source states which of Branković's five children were also Irene's, although the youngest, Catherine, bore the name of Kantakouzenos, and Mara was "clearly" the daughter of Eirene. Based on portraits of Irene with Đurađ Branković and his five children from a chrysobull preserved at the monastery of Esphigmenou on Mount Athos, dated 11 September 1429, Nicol interprets how the individuals were grouped that Stefan and Lazar were her children too. He also adds that Theodore Spandounes "records at the time of their mutilation by the Sultan Murad II in 1441 Gregory and Stephen were aged sixteen and fifteen respectively, which, if correct, signifies that Gregory too must have been a child of Eirene".

== Legends ==
Irene, being a Greek, and with her brothers also being very influential to the new despot, people began to dislike her, attributing to her many vicious and evil characteristics including that building of Smederevo was her caprice. In folk poetry she has been dubbed Prokleta Jerina (Serbian Cyrillic: Проклета Јерина, the "Damned Jerina" or "Jerina the Cursed").

The Maglič Fortress, nearby Kraljevo in Serbia is also known as the fortress of damned Jerina. It was built in the 13th century. Damned Jerina, who used to throw her lovers into the deep well inside the walls, built it, the legend reads.

The Užice Fortress has the legend similar to this. In local tradition she is described as a cruel queen who threw children from highest tower to dark river Đetinja. The meaning of river's name can be translated as "of the children".

Vuk Stefanović Karadžić wrote several Serbian folk songs where she is mentioned: "Đurđeva Jerina", "Dva Despotovića", "Ženidba Đurđa Smederevca", "Kad je Janko vojvoda udarao Đurđa despota buzdohanom", "Oblak Radosav" and "Starina Novak i knez Bogosav".

The anthroponym Irina became Jerina and it can be seen from three aspects: (1) From the aspect of phonetic adaptation of the anthroponym: the Greek name Irina became the Serbian name Jerina; (2) from the aspect of derivation of the appellative jerina (the ruins of an old town) from the anthroponym Jerina, and (3) from the aspect of the change in the meaning of the name Irina (meaning "peace" in Greek) into the name which bears a negative connotation in Serbia and the name that becomes a protective name: that is, the new-born female children, in the families which have no male children, are named Jerina in order to stop the birth of further female children.

Serbian writer Vidan Nikolić wrote a novel Prokleta Jerina about her life. Some earlier versions of this novel had a title "The Shadow of the despotess"

== See also ==
- List of Serbian consorts

== Annotations ==
1. Other names found scarcely in Serbian historiography include: Jerina Branković (Serbian Cyrillic: Јерина Бранковић [jɛ̌rina brǎːŋkɔʋit͡ɕ]) and Jerina Kantakuzina (Јерина Кантакузина).

== Sources ==
- Nicol, Donald M. (1968). The Byzantine Family of Kantakouzenos (Cantacuzenus), ca. 1100–1460: A Genealogical and Prosopographical Study. Dumbarton Oaks studies 11. Washington, DC: Dumbarton Oaks Center for Byzantine Studies.

Royal titles
| Preceded by Helena Gattilusio | Despotess of Serbia; 1414–1456 | Succeeded by Helena Palaiologina |
