= David of Trebizond =

Emperor of Trebizond from 1460 to 1461

David II Megas Komnenos
- Emperor and Autocrat of all the East and Perateia
- David Megas Komnenos, as depicted in a modern religious icon

Emperor of Trebizond
- Reign: April 1460 – 15 August 1461
- Predecessor: Alexios V
- Successor: None, Fall of Trebizond
- Born: c. 1408
- Died: 1 November 1463 (aged 54–55); Constantinople, Ottoman Empire (modern-day Istanbul, Turkey)
- Spouse: Maria of Gothia; Helena Kantakouzene
- Issue: Basil Megas Komnenos; Manuel Megas Komnenos; Anna Megale Komnene; George Megas Komnenos; 1 other daughter
- Dynasty: Komnenos
- Father: Alexios IV Megas Komnenos
- Mother: Theodora Kantakouzene

David Megas Komnenos sometimes enumerated as David II (Greek: Δαυίδ Μέγας Κομνηνός, romanized: David Megas Komnēnos; c. 1408 – 1 November 1463) was the last Emperor of Trebizond from 1460 to 1461. He was the third son of Emperor Alexios IV of Trebizond and Theodora Kantakouzene. Following the fall of Trebizond to the Ottoman Empire, he was taken captive with his family to the Ottoman capital, Constantinople, where he and his sons and nephew were executed in 1463.

In July 2013, David and his sons and nephew were canonized by the Holy Synod of the Patriarchate of Constantinople. Their feast day was determined as 1 November, the anniversary of their deaths.

== Ruler of the Trebizond Empire ==
David had played an important role throughout the reign of his older brother and predecessor John IV. He had been given the courtly title of despotes, which in Trebizond designated the heir to the throne. David had participated in his brother's expeditions against the Genoese, and also fulfilled various diplomatic tasks. In 1458 he ratified his brother's treaty with the Ottoman Sultan Mehmed II in Adrianople, and later the same year he conveyed his niece Theodora to her husband, Uzun Hassan of the Ak Koyunlu.

David ascended the throne shortly after his brother's death, sometime in April 1460. Although John IV had made his nephew Alexios V his heir, Alexios was a minor; according to Laonikos Chalkokondyles David, with the support of the Kabasitanoi archontes, pushed the young emperor aside and took the throne for himself.

With the conquest of Constantinople by the Ottoman Turks in 1453, the threat Mehmed II posed to the pocket empire had increased. David's brother John had spent the following years up to his death building alliances to protect the empire, with the Georgian princes to the east and with Uzun Hassan of the Ak Koyunlu, and David seems to have counted on their support. The Muslim rulers of Sinope and Karaman appear to have been enlisted as allies by John or Uzun Hassan.

About this time, October 1460, one Ludovico da Bologna appeared at the court of Emperor Frederick III with two men who were ostensibly the ambassadors of Persia and Georgia; more specifically, the Persian ambassador—Nicholas of Tbilisi—was the representative of George VIII of Georgia, and the Georgian ambassador—recorded as "Custopa", "Custoda", "Chastodina" and other variations—represented Qvarqvare II, prince of Samtskhe. They carried letters signed not only by those Eastern rulers, but four more, as well as three Caucasian tribes all eager to take part in an alliance against the Ottomans. Ludovico's entourage proceeded to Venice, and either there or at their next stop, Florence, a new ambassador joined his following: Michael Alighieri, who said he was the envoy of Emperor David.

In Florence, a city that was eager to build up a network of bases in the Levant, Alighieri negotiated a treaty between Florence and David of Trebizond granting to the city a consulate (fondaco) and trading terms that included a 2% levy on exports, as were enjoyed by the Genoese and Venetians in Trebizond. Like his ancestor, Dante Alighieri, Michael Alighieri was a Florentine, but had been trading on his own account in the Black Sea. Bryer mentions a document dated 28 April 1470, wherein the protectors of the Bank of St. George at Caffa gave Michael Alighieri safe conduct which covered his children and subordinates. Bryer treats Ludovico da Bologna's claims with a degree of distrust and suspicion, noting Ludovico "seems to have been too glib and later obsessed with something of the attitude of a Baron Corvo towards the Church, which failed to take his personal ambitions seriously." On the other hand, Bryer assumes Michael Alighieri was a legitimate representative of Emperor David, although the letter he bore from David to Duke Philip the Good of Burgundy "was written, if not in Italy, from an Italian point of view, and by someone who knew Trebizond well and had recently seen David Komnenos as the new Emperor." William Miller, in his account of the Empire of Trebizond, likewise assumes Michael Alighieri was the legitimate representative, while ignoring the existence of the sketchy Ludovico da Bologna, who had been the primary advocate for a Christian league.

With Western support against the Ottomans still unsolidified, David prematurely asked the Sultan for a remission of the tribute paid by his predecessor. Even worse, he made these demands through the envoys of Uzun Hassan, who made even more arrogant demands on behalf of their master. Sultan Mehmed dismissed them, telling them that they would know his answer later. That answer came the summer of the next year: a fleet under his admiral Kasim Pasha sailed along the Black Sea coast of Anatolia towards Trebizond while he led an army from Bursa eastwards towards the city.

== The fall of Trebizond ==
After pretending to be ready to negotiate with some of his neighbors, Mehmed II besieged Sinope and obtained its surrender. The Sultan sent his fleet on to Trebizond, while he led the land army against Uzun Hassan. After Mehmed took the frontier fortress of Koylu Hisar by storm, and Uzun Hassan's allies the Karamanians failed to come to his aid, Uzun Hassan sent his mother, Sara Khatun, with expensive gifts to the Sultan's camp to sue for peace. While she managed to negotiate a peace treaty between Mehmed and the Aq Qoyunlu, she could do nothing for her daughter-in-law's homeland, Trebizond. Steven Runciman repeated the exchange between Sara and Mehmed: "Why tire yourself, my son, for nothing better than Trebizond?" she asked him. He replied that the Sword of Islam was in his hand, and he would be ashamed not to tire himself for his faith.

With David's most effective ally neutralized, Mehmed II marched to Trebizond. His fleet had landed there in early July, defeated David's army, and then plundered the suburbs, besieging the city for more than a month. The Ottoman commander Mahmud Pasha Angelovic had opened negotiations with David even before his master's arrival, and David's protovestiarios, George Amiroutzes, advised the Emperor to sue for peace. When Mehmed II arrived in August, he was displeased with the negotiations, but allowed them to proceed. David was now persuaded to surrender, on the condition that he be allowed to keep his family, household and wealth, and was promised a profitable retirement in Thrace.

David's surrender on 15 August 1461 marks the end of the Empire of Trebizond and of the Byzantine imperial tradition. The deposed emperor, along with his family and courtiers, were transported to Constantinople. Meanwhile, the population of the city was divided into three groups, with some being appointed to serve the Sultan and his officers, others being added to the population of Constantinople, and the remainder being allowed to inhabit the outskirts of Trebizond itself. Some local youths were duly conscripted into the Janissaries, while the Ottoman admiral was left to garrison the city.

== After the Fall ==
David was settled in Adrianople together with his family, and received the profits of estates in the Struma River valley, comprising an annual income of some 300,000 pieces of silver. However, as a descendant of the Komnenoi family, which had ruled the Byzantine Empire for centuries, David was too prominent a symbol of the fallen regime, and could prove to be a potential rallying point for Greek resistance to Ottoman rule. Consequently, Mehmed waited for an opportunity to rid himself of an inconvenient captive.

An excuse presented itself less than two years later. According to an interpolator in the History of Chalkokondyles, referred to here as Pseudo-Chalkokondyles, David's niece, Theodora (also known as Despina Khatun), had written letters to her uncle asking that he send one of his sons or his nephew Alexios, the son of his older brother Alexander, to live with her. Pseudo-Chalkokondyles states that George Amiroutzes found these letters, and out of fear for his own safety gave them to Sultan Mehmed. Theodore Spandounes claims that the letters were forged on orders of the Sultan, but the result was the same, regardless of the authenticity of the evidence. After some deliberations, Mehmed ordered David, his three sons, Basil, Manuel and Georgios, and his nephew, Alexios, to be imprisoned.

Marginalia in a manuscript of the gospels belonging to the commercial school at Chalke provide us with the date of the imprisonment of the five men: Saturday, 26 March 1463. This date is verified by another manuscript containing the Histories of Thucydides, currently held by the London Medical Society, which also adds that David's sons had converted to Islam under the influence of members of the Kabasitanoi, who had done so out of hunger. The men were taken to Constantinople and imprisoned in the Beyoğlu jail, where with five others the last of the Komnenoi were executed with the sword on 1 November 1463 at four o'clock in the morning. Their execution was confirmed by a letter written by the Patriarch Sophronios I, who wrote that David "with his three sons" was killed "a few days" after his arrival in Constantinople.

Other members of the family fared little better. David's daughter Anna, whom he had offered in marriage to Mehmed, was taken to the Imperial harem. Later she was married to Zaganos Pasha according to some sources she was killed by her husband because she did not want to convert, while according to others, she remarried Elvanbeyzade Sinan Bey after becoming widowed or divorced. Maria Gattilusio, the widow of David's older brother Alexander, also joined the harem.

Spandounes, writing much later than these sources or Pseudo-Chalkokondyles but drawing on family traditions, reports a different fate for some of these people. He states that Maria's son Alexios had been spared; according to tradition he was given lands just outside the city walls of Galata, where he was known locally as "the Son of the Bey" and after whom the district of Beyoğlu was named. Spandounes also writes that the widowed Empress Helena Kantakouzene was heavily fined by the Sultan for burying her husband and her sons, and spent the rest of her life in poverty. Her youngest son, George, was raised as a Muslim, but when he was later allowed to visit Uzun Hasan in Persia, he fled from the court to his sister in Georgia, where he reverted to Christianity and married a Georgian princess.

== Veneration ==
Holy Martyr David
| Venerated in | Eastern Orthodoxy |
| Canonized | July 10, 2013 |
| Feast | 1 November |
| Attributes | cross and scroll |

== Genealogy ==
One of David's daughters survived him as the wife of a Gurieli ruler from the Dadiani family. The later-day Gurieli thus claimed descent from David and from dozens of emperors who were his ancestors.

David apparently had no children by his first wife Maria of Gothia. By his second wife Helena Kantakouzene, he had:

- Basil, beheaded in 1463
- Manuel, beheaded in 1463
- Anna (1447–after 1463), married Zagan Pasha and then Sinan Bey.
- George, (1460–after 1463)
- Daughter (name unknown), who probably married Duke Mamia of Guria

According to the historian Warren Treadgold, David had seven sons, six of which were executed, the other presumably being George.

== Ancestry ==
8. Alexios III of Trebizond
4. Manuel III of Trebizond
9. Theodora Kantakouzene
2. Alexios IV of Trebizond
10. David IX of Georgia
5. Gulkhan-Eudokia of Georgia
11. Sindukhtar of Samtskhe-Saatabago
1. David of Trebizond
6. Theodoros Palaiologos Kantakouzenos
3. Theodora Kantakouzene
14. John Uroš
7. Helena Ouresina Doukaina

== In popular culture ==
David and the fall of Trebizond are portrayed in Dorothy Dunnett's novel The Spring of the Ram, second book in her House of Niccolo series.

David appears as a minor character in Lawrence Schoonover's novel The Burnished Blade, where he is portrayed as an adventurous but diplomatically astute young man.

Portrayed by Hakan Gerçek in the Turkish television series Mehmed: Fetihler Sultanı (2025).

== See also ==
- Demetrio Stefanopoli, whose family claimed descent from David, and who obtained a diploma from Louis XVI recognizing his claim

David of Trebizond Komnenian dynasty Born: c. 1408 Died: 1 November 1463
Regnal titles
| Preceded by Alexios V | Emperor of Trebizond; 1460–1461 | Ottoman conquest |
