= Siege of Salmeniko =

1460–61 Ottoman victory in Greece

- Part of the Ottoman conquest of the Morea
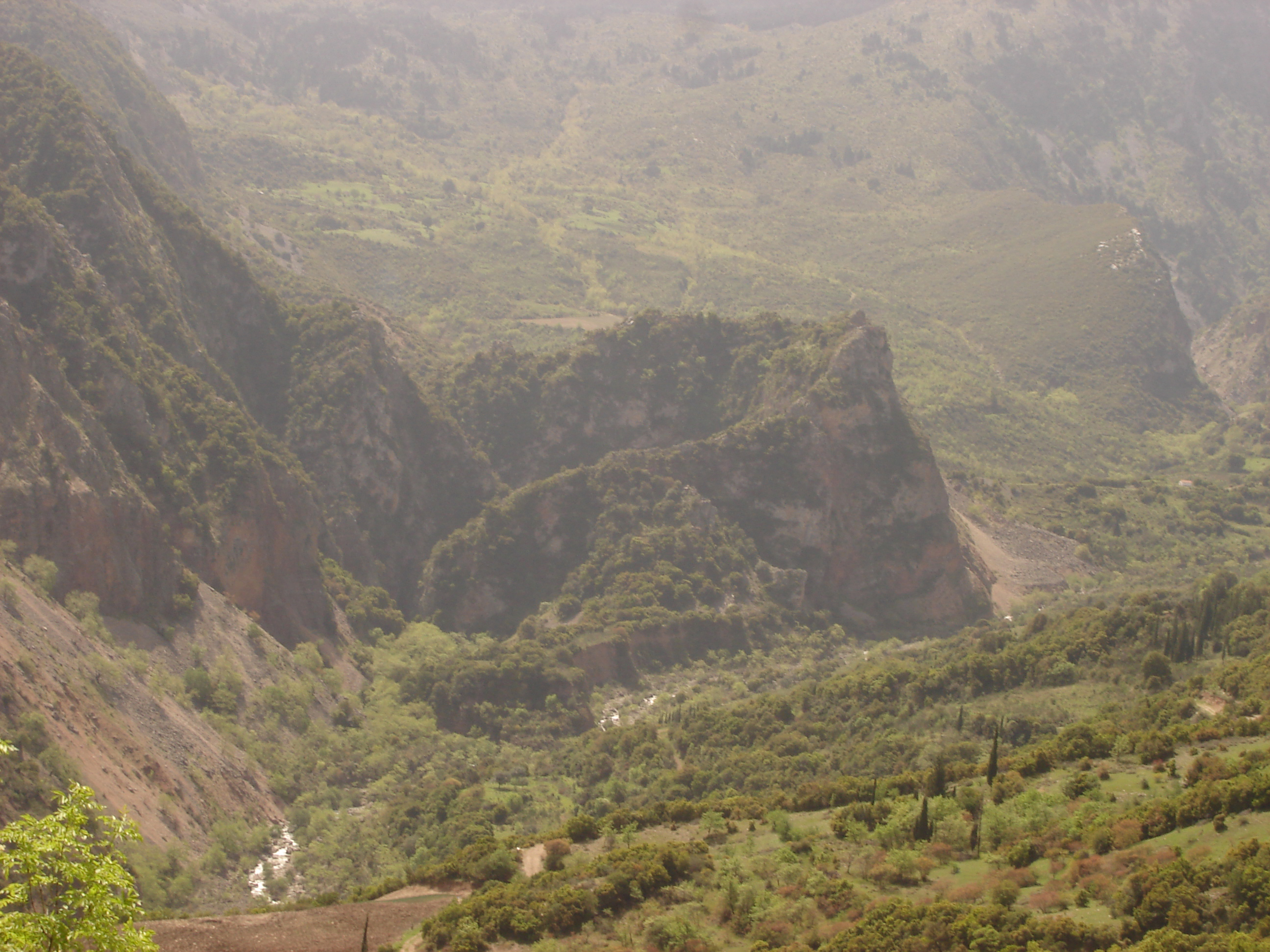
- Salmeniko Castle
| Date | 1460–1461 |
| Location | Salmeniko Castle, Morea, Greece |
| Result | Ottoman victory |

Belligerents
| Ottoman Empire | Byzantine Empire; Republic of Venice |

Commanders and leaders
| Mehmed II; Mahmud Angelović; Zagan Pasha; Hamza Zenevisi | Graitzas Palaiologos (surrendered) |

Units involved
| Jannisary; Ottoman Army | Garrison; Albanians |

Casualties and losses
| Unknown | 6,000 prisoners |

The Siege of Salmeniko was the last stronghold where Mehmed II encountered resistance during his second campaign in Morea. It was the final center of resistance for the Byzantine Empire. After a year-long siege, the fortress fell, marking the complete collapse of the Eastern Roman Empire.

== Occupation ==
After successfully completing the siege of Gardiki, Mehmed II continued his advance. Thomas Palaiologos made no attempt to defend his country against Mehmed. When he saw that Mehmed was approaching Navarino, he took his family and fled to Corfu with a few ships. Venice believed that by sheltering Thomas they had spared themselves the possibility of Mehmed's anger being directed against them. However, Mehmed devastated the entire region, burning and destroying it and killing many Venetians. Meanwhile, another Ottoman army under the command of Zagan Pasha captured Kalavryta, Francois, and Santomeri.

Mehmed II also withdrew from Venetian territory, capturing the fortresses along his route and joining forces with Zagan Pasha. They subsequently took the fortresses of Greveno, Vostitsa, and Kastrimenon as well, but Mehmed encountered fierce resistance at Salmenikon.

== Siege ==
The strong mountain fortress of Salmenikon, located between Patras and Aigio, was defended by Graitzas Palaiologos. Graitzas rejected the sultan's call to surrender. Mehmed II subjected the fortress to artillery bombardment, but it proved ineffective. The Janissaries’ assaults on the walls also failed. However, after a seven-day siege, when the water supplies were cut off, the Greeks and Albanians living in the lower part of the town surrendered. Six thousand captives were taken; the sultan kept the young men for himself, and the rest were distributed among his officers. Yet the fortress itself had still not fallen. Graitzas declared that he would surrender only if the sultan withdrew. Mehmed accepted this condition and returned to Aigio, leaving the battlefield to Hamza Zenebisi. Graitzas, however, did not trust the promises given by the Turks. To test Hamza, he sent a small part of the garrison outside. Hamza immediately attacked the men and seized their possessions. As a result, Graitzas refused to surrender in any manner.

Zagan Pasha was reappointed as a sanjak-bey, but Salmenikon continued to resist. The heroic commander of the fortress finally surrendered only after a siege that lasted one year. He was, however, allowed to withdraw to Venetian territory. Graitzas inspired respect even among his enemies; it is said that Mahmud Pasha exclaimed, “I saw many slavish souls in the Morea, but he was a true man.”

The members of the fortress garrison were also allowed to depart freely to Venetian territory. During this campaign, Mehmed II captured around 360 fortresses in the Morea. Wherever the Ottoman army advanced, the population was brought under submission.
