= Grgur Branković =

Serbian noble

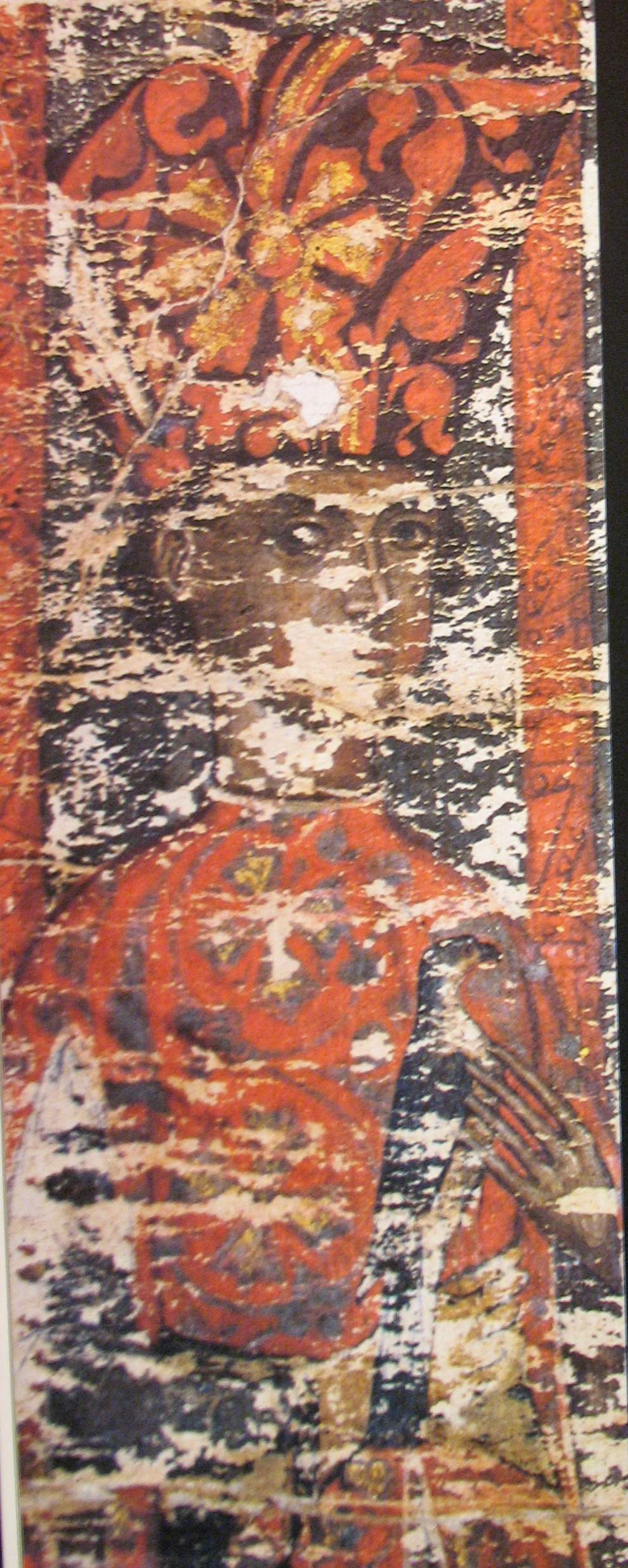
- Grgur Branković in the Esphigmenou charter (1429)
- Born: 1415
- Died: 16 October 1459 (aged 43–44); Serbian Orthodox monastery Hilandar in Mount Athos
- Noble family: Branković
- Spouse: Jelisaveta (?)
- Issue: Vuk Grgurević
- Father: Đurađ Branković
- Mother: Irene Kantakouzene
- Occupation: Serbian nobleman

Grgur Branković (1415 – 16 October 1459) was a 15th-century Serbian nobleman. Grgur was the eldest son of Serbian Despot Đurađ Branković and Eirene Kantakouzene. In 1439, after the Ottomans captured Smederevo, the capital of the Serbian Despotate, they appointed Grgur as governor of his father's captured estates. Because he plotted against the Ottomans, they dismissed him and put him in prison in April 1441. In May 1441 the Ottomans blinded Grgur and his brother Stefan. In 1458, during the struggle for the throne of the Serbian Despotate, Grgur resurfaced claiming it for himself or his son. In 1459 he retreated to Hilandar Monastery, where he took monastic vows and the name German (Germanus). Grgur died in Hilandar on October 16, 1459.

== Family ==
He was the eldest son of Đurađ Branković and Eirene Kantakouzene. He had three brothers (Todor, Stefan and Lazar) and two sisters (Mara and Catherine Cantacuzena).

After the Ottomans captured Smederevo in 1439, Grgur was allowed to govern his father's former estates in southern Serbia, as Ottoman vassal. During the winter 1440, Grgurs' father and Serbian Despot Đurađ Branković traveled to Zeta with his wife and several hundred cavalry through the Ottoman province governed by Grgur. Đurađ had intention to mobilize forces to recover his lost territories of Serbian Despotate. In April 1441 the Ottomans, probably justifiably, accused Grgur of treason and dismissed him from his governorship. On 8 May 1441 both Grgur and his brother Stefan were blinded, based on the order of Sultan Murad II. According to John Van Antwerp Fine, Jr. and Sima Ćirković, Grgur resurfaced in 1458, claiming the succession of the vacant throne of Serbian Despotate for himself or his son. Branković retreated to Hilandar where he took monastic vowes and monastic name German. He soon died there on 16 October 1459. His son was Vuk Grgurević the titular Despot of Serbia from 1471 until his death in 1485.

== Ancestry ==
Ancestors of Grgur Branković

16. Mladen
8. Branko Mladenović
4. Vuk Branković
2. Djuradj Branković
20. Pribac Hrebeljanović
10. Lazar Hrebeljanović
5. Mara Lazarević
22. Vratko Nemanjić
11. Milica Nemanjić
1. Lazar Branković
24. John VI Kantakouzenos
12. Matthew Kantakouzenos
25. Irene Asanina
6. Theodore Kantakouzenos
26. Demetrios Palaiologos
13. Irene Palaiologina
27. Theodora Komnene?
3. Irene Kantakouzene
28. Simeon Uroš
14. John Uroš
29. Thomais Orsini
7. Helena Ouresina Doukina
30. Radoslav Hlapen
15. Unnamed daughter of Radoslav Hlapen
31. Irene?
