= George Palaiologos Kantakouzenos =

Byzantine nobleman (c. 1390 – 1456/59)

George Palaiologos Kantakouzenos (Greek: Γεώργιος Παλαιολόγος Καντακουζηνός; ca. 1390 – 1456/59) was a Byzantine aristocrat, a member of the Kantakouzenos family, and adventurer. He is also known by the Turkish nickname Sachatai, which he earned in the service of the Despot Constantine early in his military career.

== Life ==
George Palaiologos Kantakouzenos was likely the son of Theodore Palaiologos Kantakouzenos. Among his siblings were the Despotess of Serbia Irene Kantakouzene, the Empress of Trebizond Helena, and the unnamed wife of King George VIII of Georgia. He was also a cousin of the last two Byzantine emperors, John VIII Palaiologos and Constantine XI Palaiologos.

He spent his youth in the Byzantine capital, Constantinople, where he studied under John Chortasmenos. In later life he moved to the Despotate of the Morea, where he is attested in documents from Dubrovnik written in 1431. He had scholarly inclinations and maintained a library at Kalavryta, where he was visited by Cyriacus of Ancona in 1436.

When the Despot Constantine (the future Constantine XI) left for Constantinople in September 1437 to govern the city during the absence of his brother John VIII Palaiologos, George also left Greece. He visited his sister Helena in Trebizond, then his other sister Irene in Serbia, where he decided to settle. He assisted in the construction and defense of the Castle of Smederevo that his sister and brother-in-law Đurađ Branković began in 1430; for a while he commanded the garrison at that fortification. A note dated 31 May 1454 in a manuscript of Procopius (Cod. Palatin. gr. 278) indicates that it belonged to George Kantakouzenos while he was living at Smederevo.

His great-grandson, the historian Theodore Spandounes, recorded that George led the defense of Smederevo against the attacks of the Hungarians in 1456, refusing to surrender the fortress even when the attackers paraded his captive son Theodore before the walls. The historian Donald Nicol, who studied the Kantakouzenos family, believes that George was not present at the first Turkish capture of the fortress by Murad II in 1439, when defense of Smederevo was in the hands of his brother Thomas, nor at its final siege and capture by Mehmet II on 20 June 1459.

Nicol dates his death between 1456 and 1459, and argues that this George Kantakouzenos is not identical with the "George Palaiologos" who, according to George Sphrantzes, was involved in the conflict between the Despots Demetrios and Thomas Palaiologos in the Morea in 1459.

== Family ==
Hugues Busac, compiling the genealogy of his wife Carola Cantacuzene de Flory, describes George Palaiologos Kantakouzenos as her grandfather and the brother of the Grand Domestic Andronikos Palaiologos Kantakouzenos. Spandounes claimed him as his maternal grandfather, and elsewhere describes him as the grandson of the Emperor John VI Kantakouzenos. Nicol believes Spandounes is in error, and the Emperor John VI was his great-grandfather and Matthew Kantakouzenos his grandfather.

Although there is no surviving record of his wife's name, Hugues Busac credits him with a family of nine children, four sons and five daughters. According to Nicol, they are:

- Theodore Kantakouzenos (died 1459?)
- Manuel Kantakouzenos (flourished 1450–1470)
- Thomas Kantakouzenos (flourished 1460), only known through Busac's genealogy.
- Demetrios Kantakouzenos, of whom nothing certain is known.
- An unnamed daughter, who married George Raoul; Raoul served as an envoy for the Despot of the Morea Thomas Palaiologos in July 1460
- Another unnamed daughter, who married Nicholas Palaiologos.
- Zoe Kantakouzene de Flory, who married James II de Flory, Count of Jaffa, and the parents of Hugues Busac's wife Carola.
- Anna Kantakouzene, who married Vladislav Hercegović
- Another unnamed daughter, whom Nicol speculates was the mother of Eudokia Kantakouzene, the mother of Theodore Spandounes.

== Sources ==
- Nicol, Donald M. (1968). The Byzantine Family of Kantakouzenos (Cantacuzenus), ca. 1100–1460: A Genealogical and Prosopographical Study. Dumbarton Oaks studies 11. Washington, DC: Dumbarton Oaks Center for Byzantine Studies. OCLC 390843.
- Trapp, Erich; Walther, Rainer; Beyer, Hans-Veit; Sturm-Schnabl, Katja (1981). "10959. Καντακουζηνός, Γεώργιος Παλαιολόγος". Prosopographisches Lexikon der Palaiologenzeit (in German). Vol. 5. Vienna: Verlag der Österreichischen Akademie der Wissenschaften. ISBN 3-7001-3003-1.
