= Theodore Kantakouzenos =

Byzantine nobleman (died 1410)

Theodore Palaiologos Kantakouzenos (Greek: Θεόδωρος Παλαιολόγος Καντακουζηνός, romanized: Theodoros Palaiologos Kantakouzenos; after 1361 – 1410) was a Byzantine nobleman. A probable close relation of Emperor John VI Kantakouzenos, under Manuel II Palaiologos he repeatedly served as an imperial ambassador and envoy.

== Background ==
Theodore is theorised to have been the son of Matthew Kantakouzenos, son of Emperor John VI, and his wife Irene Palaiologina. Were this identification to be accurate, Theodore would likely have been born after the couple had taken residence in the Peloponnese in 1361, since he was not listed by the former emperor as being among his descendants prior to this time. Alternatively, given the unusually large age gap between Theodore's children and Matthew, (Note: According to historian Lindsay L Brook, "it is unlikely on chronological grounds that Matthias, probably born shortly after 1325, could have been the grandfather of Eirene and her brothers (all of whom died between 1453 and 1463).") it may be more likely that Theodore was instead the child of one of Matthew's sons, Demetrios or John, both of whom had reached maturity by 1361. As there is evidence to support both identifications, it is not possible to establish Theodore's parentage with any more certainty. (Note: Karl Hopf identified Theodore as having been the son of John, though without stating any evidence.) The referral in historical sources of Theodore as the theíos (uncle) of Emperor Manuel II Palaiologos does not offer any further clarification as by this point, theíos had become a general term for cousin.

== Life ==
Theodore is known to have maintained correspondence with Demetrios Kydones and John Chortasmenos, who had composed verses giving praise to his house as well as to Theodore himself. The Byzantist Donald Nicol had suggested that Theodore was among the volunteers who left Constantinople in 1383 to join Manuel II in the defence of Thessaloniki against the Turks, though Nicol subsequently withdrew his support of this view.

During the summer of 1397, Constantinople was besieged by the Ottomans under Sultan Bayezid I. Due to the desperation of the situation, Theodore, alongside John of Natala, was sent to the court of Charles VI of France as an imperial ambassador, bearing a letter from Manuel II requesting the French king's military aid. (Note: In this letter, Manuel II described Theodore as "ambassiatorem nostrum strenuum et desideratissimum avunculum, imperii nostri nobilem et circumspectum virum atque sapientem et expertum" ("our ambassador, our energetic and much-desired uncle, a noble and circumspect man of our empire, and a wise and experienced man").) Arriving in October, Theodore was received by a sympathetic Charles, who treated the ambassadors with great courtesy and promised to send assistance within the year. Further to this, Charles also provided funds for the two nobles to travel to the British Isles to treat with Richard II of England, with the aim of soliciting further aid. Though the latter was too distracted by domestic troubles at this point to provide any support, Theodore and John were able to return with six hundred French troops led by the Marshal Boucicaut, clearing the immediate approach to Constantinople and breaking the blockade.

In the autumn of 1398, Theodore was named ambassador to Venice, where he maintained a commercial presence as well as a political one, and was awarded citizenship of the republic by the Doge in December of that year. In 1400, alongside Archbishop Michael of Bethlehem and Constantine Rhales Palaiologos, Theodore was dispatched as an envoy to the Metropolitan of Kyev by Patriarch Matthew I. In 1409, Theodore attended the synod in Constantinople which condemned the two wayward bishops, Makarios of Ankyra and Matthew of Medeia; he was described as being a Senator during this time. He died of plague in 1410.

== Family ==
Theodore's wife was Helena Ouresina Doukaina, member of the Nemanjić dynasty, a daughter of John Uroš, ruler of Thessaly. He is believed to have had the following issue:

- George Palaiologos Kantakouzenos, "Sachatai" (d. circa 1456–59), scholar and military commander, defended Smederevo during a Hungarian attack in 1456
- Andronikos Palaiologos Kantakouzenos (d. June 3/4, 1453, executed), the last Grand Domestic of the Byzantine Empire
- Thomas Kantakouzenos (d. July 25, 1463 in Adrianople), diplomat for Đurađ Branković, Despot of Serbia
- Irene Kantakouzene (d. May 1457), wife of Serbian Despot Đurađ Branković
- Helena Kantakouzene or Theodora Kantakouzene, Empress of Trebizond (Note: Thierry Ganchou has more recently argued that Helena is a phantom, and had never existed. He states that she was likely confused with her supposed husband's mother, Theodora, who may have been the actual child of Theodore.)
- A daughter who married George VIII, King of Georgia

The Byzantist Donald Nicol, who initially attributed the offspring to Demetrios Kantakouzenos, later reversed his position and stated that it was more likely that Theodore was the actual father. His reason was that, given that George's eldest son was also named Theodore, the new theory would correlate with a common Byzantine practice of naming the eldest son for their grandfather. Similarly, one of Irene's sons was named Todor, possibly also being named after Theodore.
