= George Amiroutzes =

Pontic Greek scholar and philosopher (ca 1400–ca 1470)

George Amiroutzes (Pontic: Γεώργιος Ἀμιρούτζης; c. 1400 – c. 1470) was a Pontic Greek Renaissance scholar, philosopher and civil servant of the late Byzantine era. He was praised and respected for his outstanding knowledge, not only of theology and philosophy, but also of the natural sciences, medicine, rhetoric and poetry, all of which earned him the epithet the Philosopher (o Φιλόσοφος). He is a controversial figure due to his role in the fall of Trebizond and his later behavior as a servant of Sultan Mehmed II.

== Life ==
Amiroutzes was born in Trebizond. His first appearance in the historical record was as a lay advisor to the imperial delegation from Trebizond to the Council of Ferrara-Florence. There he strongly supported the union of churches but upon return to Constantinople he made statements against the papal primacy and Filioque. According to a papal document 100 florins were given to protonotarios George as a subsidy; it was conjectured that Amiroutzes was thus bribed to support the union.

The Genoese archives document Amiroutzes leading a diplomatic mission on behalf of Emperor John IV, seeking marriage alliance between a member of the Komnenos family, and a daughter of the Genoese doge Lodovico di Campofregoso.

However, he was denounced by his fellow Greeks as an opportunist, a traitor and a renegade for his familiarity with Sultan Mehmed the Conqueror. He was a nephew to the Grand Vizier Mahmud Pasha of the Ottoman Empire, and while serving as protovestiarios Amiroutzes helped speed the fall of the Empire of Trebizond by persuading Emperor David to surrender to the Ottomans to prevent bloodshed to its inhabitants. Mehmed sent the Emperor, his family, and nobles (including Amiroutzes himself) to Constantinople on one of his ships. He divided the rest of the inhabitants of Trebizond into three classes: the first became the servants and slaves of Mehmed and his followers; the second were transported to Constantinople to settle there; and the third part were exiled from the city.

Some years later, David was executed. The traditional story says that David received a letter from his niece, Theodora, the wife of Uzun Hassan of the Ak Koyunlu, asking that one of his sons or his nephew Alexios be sent to her. This letter fell into the hands of Amiroutzes, who passed it on to Mehmed in order to prove his loyalty to the Sultan. The Sultan claimed the letter was proof of treason and executed the inconvenient former emperor and his sons.

George Amiroutzes himself was very popular with the Ottoman court, and one of the advisors of Mehmed on Christianity and Greco-Roman philosophy. He was granted land by the Ottoman Sultan and one of his sons, named after Mehmed, was charged with responsibility for the Greek scriptoria in the Empire.

After Athens fell to the Ottoman forces, Amiroutzes fell in love with one of the prisoners from that conquest, the widow of the last Duke of Athens. He desired to marry her, despite the fact his own wife and children were still alive. When the patriarch Joasaph Kokkas refused to consent to this marriage, Amiroutzes, helped by his cousin Mahmud Pasha, dethroned the patriarch and compelled him to shave his beard as punishment. Amiroutzes also punished the high ecclesiastical official, whom he unsuccessfully tried to bribe to assist him convince the patriarch, by having the man's nose slit. Amiroutzes met his end while playing at dice.

== Known works ==
- Dialogus de fide
- Letter to Bessarion on the Fall of Trebizond
- Letters to Theodore Agallianos about Agallianos's book On Providence
- A letter on the Council at Florence, authenticity disputed
- various poems dedicated to Mehmed II and others

== See also ==
- Greek scholars in the Renaissance

== Bibliography ==
- Kapriev, Georgi (2019). "Georgios Amiroutzes". In: Brungs, Alexander; Kapriev, Georgi; Mudroch, Vilem (eds). Die Philosophie des Mittelalters 1: Byzanz, Judentum [The Philosophy of the Middle Ages 1: Byzantium, Judaism]. Grundriss der Geschichte der Philosophie, new edition. Basel: Schwabe, ISBN 978-3-7965-2623-7, pp. 222-224.
