= Anna Komnene (daughter of David of Trebizond) =

Trapezuntine princess

Anna Hatun
- Princess of Trebizond
- Born: Anna Megale Komnene; 1447; Trebizond
- Died: after 1463; Constantinople, Ottoman Empire (present day Istanbul, Turkey)
- Spouse: Zagan Pasha (m. 1463) Elvanbeyzade Sinan Bey (disputed)
Names
- Ancient Greek: Άννα Μεγάλη Κομνηνή; English: Anna Megalē Komnēnē; Ottoman Turkish: آنا فاتنة; English: Anna Hatun
- House: Komnenos
- Father: David II of Trebizond
- Mother: Helena Kantakouzene
- Religion: Orthodox Christianity

Anna Megale Komnene (Modern Greek: Άννα Μεγάλη Κομνηνή, transliterated: Anna Megalē Komnēnē, known also as Anna Hatun, Ottoman Turkish: آنا فاتنة; 1447 - after 1463) was a Trapezuntine princess and daughter of the last Emperor of Trebizond, David II and his wife Helena Kantakouzene.

She entered Sultan Mehmed II the Conqueror’s harem as one of his “noble guests” and was later married off to his vizier, Zağanos Pasha; according to one account, she eventually divorced him and married Elvanbeyzade Sinan Bey

== Biography ==
Her father offered her as a wife to Sultan Mehmed II when he captured Constantinople in 1453, but he refused. However, in 1461, after Mehmed conquered Trebizond, he decided to add Anna to his harem. However, Anna had no personal relationship with the sultan. It is improbable that the union was ever consummated: for several generations already, the Ottoman dynasty no longer fathered children with foreign noblewomen, to avoid external interference in the succession.

In 1463, Mehmed executed David, three of his sons and his nephew Alexius (son of Alexander of Trebizond and Maria Gattilusio) on charges of communicating with the Sultan's enemies Uzun Hasan and his wife Despina Khatun (David's niece as daughter of John IV of Trabzon). Later, Gevherhan Hatun (Mehmed II's daughter) married Ughurlu Muhammad (Uzun Hasan's son). Their son, Ahmad Beg, married Aynişah Sultan (Bayezid II's daughter and Mehmed II's granddaughter) and they had two daughters and a son.

Anna was suspected of having facilitated the exchange of letters, but in the end she suffered no consequences.

In the same year, however, Mehmed married her to his vizier, Zagan Pasha, who had previously been married to his sister Fatma Hatun.

Anna's fate is not certain. According to some sources, Anna was killed by her husband because she did not want to convert, while according to others, she remarried Elvanbeyzade Sinan Bey after becoming widowed or divorced.

Her date of death is unknown, along with her place of burial.

== Sources ==
- Leslie P. Peirce (1993). The imperial harem: women and sovereignty in the Ottoman Empire. Oxford University Press. OCLC 27811454.
- Yavuz Bahadıroğlu (2007). Resimli Osmanlı tarihi (in Turkish). Nesil yayınları. OCLC 235010971.
