= Zagan Pasha =

Grand Vizier of the Ottoman Empire from 1453 to 1456

Lala Zaganos Pasha
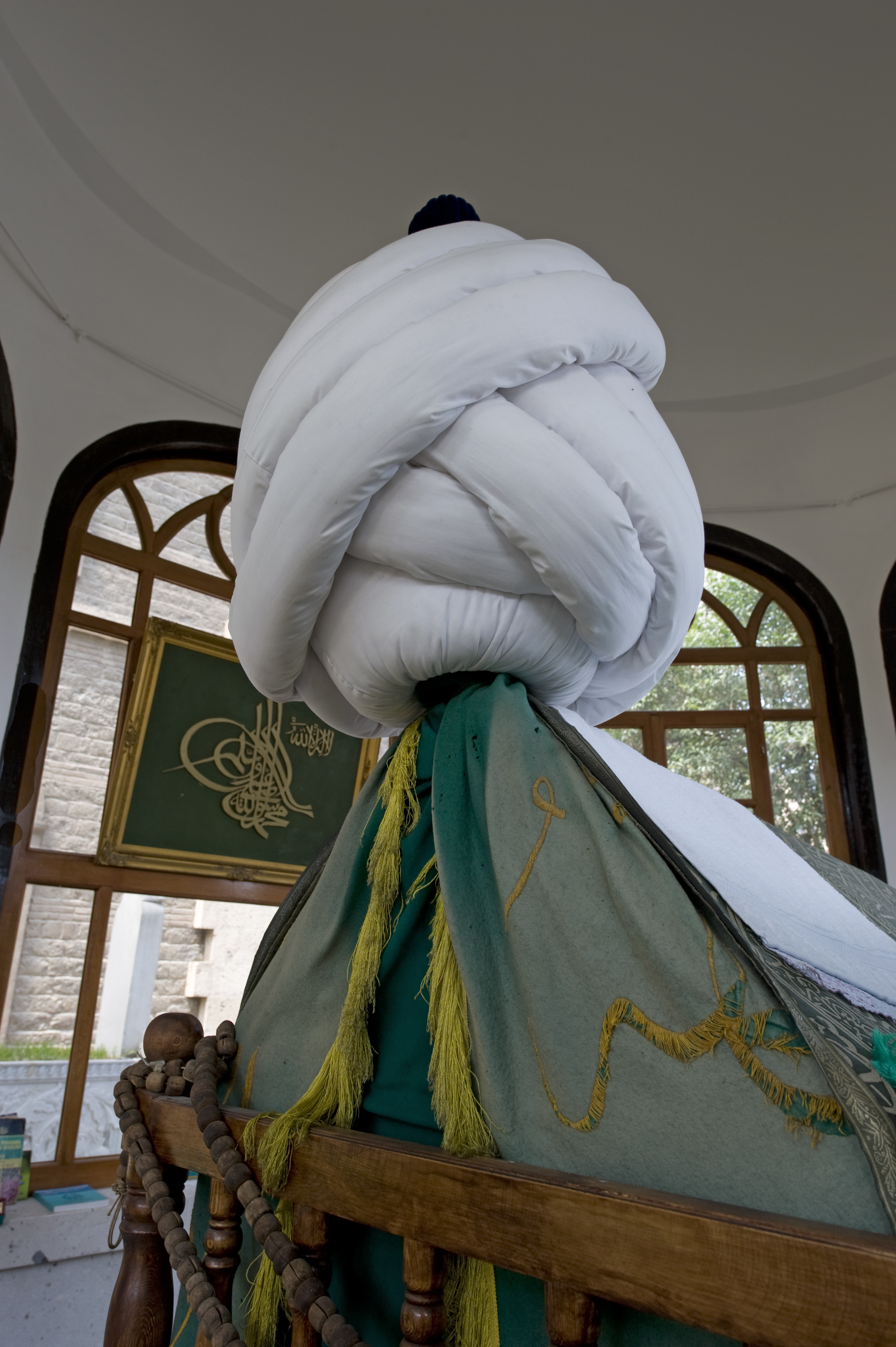
- The cenotaph of Zaganos

Grand Vizier of the Ottoman Empire
- In office 1 June 1453 – 1456
- Monarch: Mehmed II
- Preceded by: Çandarlı Halil Pasha the Younger
- Succeeded by: Mahmud Pasha Angelovic

Kapudan Pasha
- In office 1463–1466
- Preceded by: Yakup Bey
- Succeeded by: Mahmud Pasha Angelovic

Personal details
- Born: c. 1426
- Died: 1469 (aged 42–43) Balıkesir, Ottoman Empire (modern Turkey)
- Spouse(s): Sitti Nefise Hatun; Fatma Hatun; Anna Hatun
- Children: First marriage Mehmed Bey; Ali Çelebi; Hatice Hatun; Selçuk Hatun; Second marriage Hamza Bey; Ahmed Çelebi

Military service
- Allegiance: Ottoman Empire
- Branch/service: Ottoman Navy; Ottoman Army
- Rank: Kapudan Pasha (grand admiral; 1463–1466)
- Battles/wars: Fall of Constantinople; Siege of Belgrade (1456); Ottoman conquest of the Morea; Siege of Salmeniko; Crusade of Varna; Albanian-Ottoman Wars (1432-1479)

Zaganos or Zagan Pasha (Ottoman Turkish: زاغنوس پاشا, Turkish: Zağanos Paşa; c. 1426 – 1469) was an Ottoman military commander who according to Steven Runciman and other reputable historians was of Greek origin, although an Albanian, Slavic or Christian Turkish origin has also been postulated. He held the titles and ranks of kapudan pasha and the highest military rank, grand vizier, during the reign of Sultan Mehmed II "The Conqueror". Originally a Christian, who was conscripted and converted through the devşirme system, he became a Muslim and rose through the ranks of the janissaries. He became one of the prominent military commanders of Mehmed II and a lala – the sultan's advisor, mentor, tutor, councillor, protector, all at once. He removed his rival, the previous Grand Vizier Çandarlı Halil Pasha the Younger, amid the fall of Constantinople. He later served as the governor of Thessaly of Macedonia.

== Life ==
=== Origin and early life ===
Zaganos was conscripted through the Devşirme system and rose through the ranks of the janissaries. He is thought to have been originally a Greek Orthodox Christian. Although most sources mention him as being of Greek origin, others state that he was of Albanian origin, mixed Slavic and Greek or Turkish and Greek origin.

In a vakfiye (foundation) his name appears as "Zağanos bin Abdullah", which indicates that he was of devshirme origin.

When Mehmed II was exiled in 1446, Zagan accompanied him.

=== Second Vizier ===
Young Mehmed II had after his return and accession (18 February 1451) confirmed Çandarlı Halil Pasha the Younger as his first Vizier (even though he seems to have disliked him), and raised Zaganos Pasha from third to second Vizier. Halil Pasha had been appointed first Vizier in 1439, after the demotion of Ishak Pasha. Zaganos, who was younger, was jealous of the position of Halil Pasha.

=== Conquest of Constantinople ===
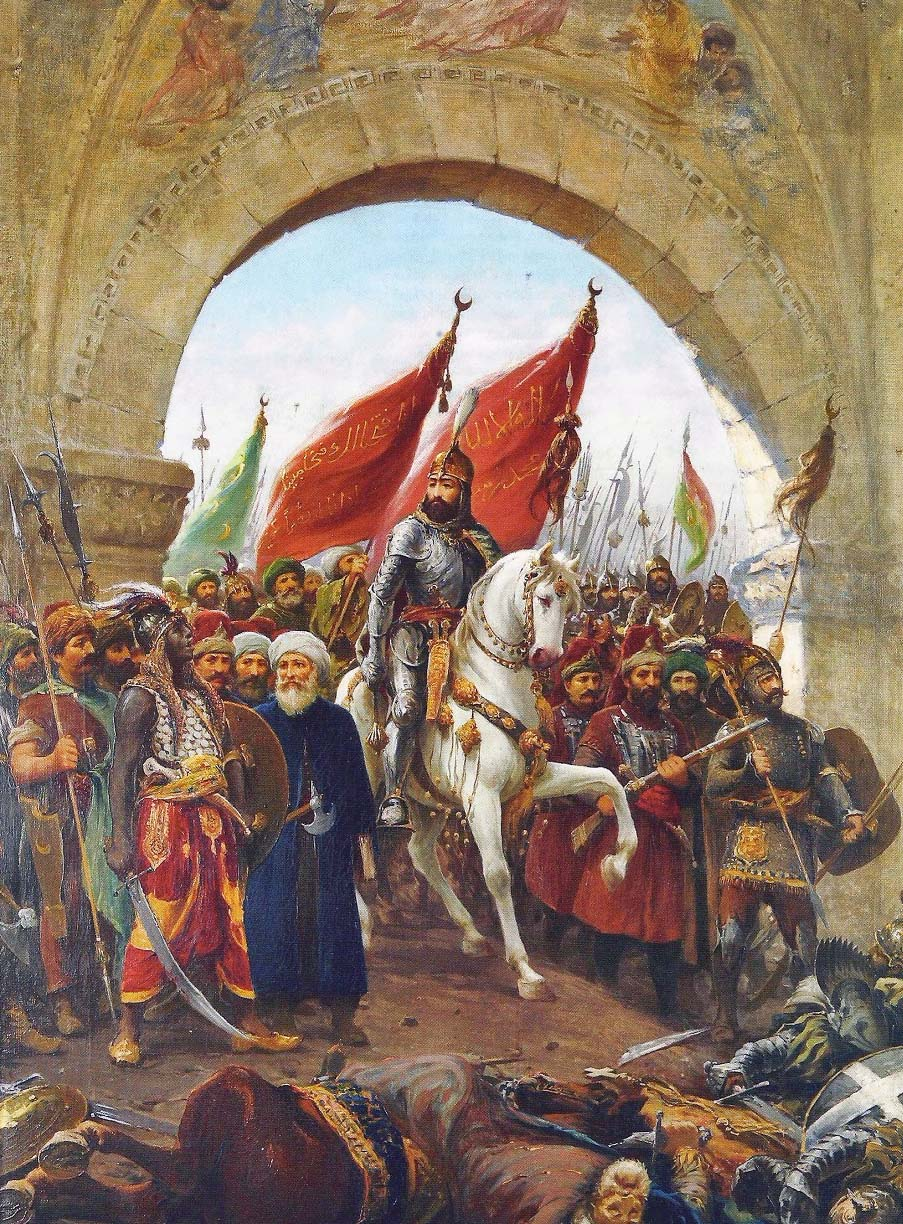
Sultan Mehmed II's entry into Constantinople, painting by Fausto Zonaro (1854–1929).

During the Siege of Constantinople, the bulk of the Ottoman army were encamped south of the Golden Horn. The regular European troops, stretched out along the entire length of the walls, were commanded by Karadja Pasha. The regular troops from Anatolia under Ishak Pasha were stationed south of the Lycus down to the Sea of Marmara. Mehmed himself erected his red-and-gold tent near the Mesoteichion, where the guns and the elite regiments, the Janissaries, were positioned. The bashi-bazouks were spread out behind the front lines. Other troops under Zaganos were employed north of the Golden Horn. Communication was maintained by a road that had been constructed over the marshy head of the Horn. After the inconclusive frontal offensives, the Ottomans sought to break through the walls by constructing tunnels in an effort to mine them from mid-May to 25 May. Many of the sappers were miners of German origin sent from Novo Brdo by the Serbian Despot. They were placed under the command of Zaganos Pasha. However, the Byzantines employed an engineer named Johannes Grant (who was said to be German but was most probably Scottish), who had counter-mines dug, allowing Byzantine troops to enter the mines and kill the Turkish workers. The Byzantines intercepted the first Serbian tunnel on the night of 16 May. Subsequent tunneling efforts were interrupted on 21, 23, and 25 May, destroying them with Greek fire and vigorous combat. On 23 May, the Byzantines captured and tortured two Turkish officers, who revealed the location of all the Turkish tunnels, which were then destroyed. On 21 May, Mehmed sent an ambassador to Constantinople and offered to lift the siege if they gave him the city. Constantine XI accepted to pay higher tributes to the sultan and recognized the status of all the conquered castles and lands in the hands of the Turks as Ottoman possessions. Around this time, Mehmed had a final council with his senior officers. Here he encountered some resistance; one of his Viziers, the veteran Halil Pasha, who had always disapproved of Mehmed's plans to conquer the city, now admonished him to abandon the siege in the face of recent adversity. Halil was overruled by Zaganos, who insisted on an immediate attack. Having been accused of bribery, Halil Pasha was put to death later that year. Mehmed planned to overpower the walls by sheer force, expecting that the weakened Byzantine defense by the prolonged siege would now be worn out before he ran out of troops and started preparations for a final all-out offensive.

After the Ottoman occupation of Constantinople, the Sultan ordered Zaganos to set out with his galleys for Galata, to prevent the Byzantine ships from setting sail.

The stories of Halil Pasha's collaboration with the Byzantines were most likely spread by the faction of Zaganos. Zaganos succeeded Halil Pasha as Grand Vizier. In 1456, however, Zaganos was made a scapegoat after a failed expedition against Hungarian-held Belgrade. Zaganos' daughter was expelled from the Sultan's harem, and the two were expelled to Balıkesir, where he probably had property. In 1459, Zaganos returned and became Kapudan Pasha of the fast-growing Ottoman navy, and the next year he was the governor of Thessaly and Macedonia.

== Personality and appearance ==
Zaganos was said to be a tall and intelligent man. He has been called the most cruel Ottoman captain of his time, and was said to be an enemy of Christians. He was in absolute loyalty to Mehmed II, even when he was just a prince, knowing that his prospects depended on his master's success. Zaganos was a soldier who believed that the Ottoman Empire must always expand in order to keep the enemies off-balance. He was known for his warlike beliefs and played an important role in the 1453 Fall of Constantinople.

He was one of the prominent Ottoman military commanders of Mehmed II (Mehmed the Conqueror) and a lala, at once an advisor, mentor, tutor, councilor, and protector, for the sultan.

== Military achievements ==
During the final siege of Constantinople, Zagan Pasha's troops were the first to reach the towers. Ulubatlı Hasan was the first soldier who reached the tower. During the siege many of the sappers were placed under the command of Zagan Pasha. Mehmed took Zaganos' advice almost exclusively.

Mehmed II honored him for his loyalty and honesty, along with the Sultan's two other Viziers, Halil Pasha and Sarica Pasha, by naming the three great towers of Rumeli Hisari after them. The tower to the south is named after Zaganos Pasha.

== Family ==
=== Wives ===
He had three wives:

- Sitti Nefise Hatun. Daughter of Timurtaşoğlu Oruç Pasha, governor-general of Anatolia under Murad II. By her he had two sons and two daughters. She died or Zagan divorced by her before 1444.
- Fatma Hatun (1430 - 1464 or after). Daughter of Sultan Murad II and sister of Sultan Mehmed II. They married in 1444 and divorced in 1462. By her he had two sons.
- Anna Hatun (m. 1463). Daughter of Emperor David of Trebizond and Helena Kantakouzene, daughter of Demetrios I Kantakouzenos. Mehmed II placed her in his harem after defeating her father; later, he married her off to his vizier, Zagan Pasha.

=== Sons ===
He had at least four sons:

- Mehmed Bey - son of Sitti Nefise Hatun
- Ali Çelebi - son of Sitti Nefise Hatun
- Hamza Bey - son of Fatma Hatun
- Ahmed Çelebi - son of Fatma Hatun. He became an important adviser to his cousin, Sultan Bayezid II.

=== Daughters ===
He had at least two daughters:

- Hatice Hatun - daughter of Sitti Nefise Hatun. Mehmed II married her in 1453 and divorced her in 1456. She was exiled to Balıkesir with her father, Zaganos Pasha. After Mehmed's death, she married a statesman.
- Selçuk Hatun - daughter of Sitti Nefise Hatun. She married Mahmud Pasha Angelovic. By her husband she had a son, Ali Bey, and a daughter, Hatice Hatun.

== Legacy ==
His, as well as his family's, mausoleum is located in his endowment (1454), Zagan Pasha Mosque, in Balıkesir.

== Portrayals ==
- Neşet Berküren plays Zaganos Pasha in Turkish film İstanbul'un Fethi (1951).
- Zaganos Pasha is portrayed by Sedat Mert in Turkish film Fetih 1453 (2012).
- Ushan Çakır plays Zaganos Pasha in the Turkish TV series documentary Rise of Empires: Ottoman.
- Sinan Albayrak plays Zaganos Pasha in the Turkish TV series Mehmed: Fetihler Sultanı

== Sources ==
- Babinger, Franz (1992) [1978]. Mehmed the Conqueror and His Time. Bollingen Series 96. Translated from the German by Ralph Manheim. Edited, with a preface, by William C. Hickman. Princeton, New Jersey: Princeton University Press. ISBN 0-691-09900-6.
- J. R. Melville Jones, The Siege of Constantinople 1453: Seven Contemporary Accounts, Hakkert, 1973, p. 7: "Zagan Pasha"
- Ellis Goldberg, Reşat Kasaba, Joel S. Migdal, "Rules and rights in the Middle East" (1993), p. 153
- Kinross, Patrick Balfour (1977). The Ottoman centuries: the rise and fall of the Turkish Empire. Cape. ISBN 978-0-224-01379-6. "Zaganos Pasha"
- Nicolle, David; Haldon, John F.; Turnbull, Stephen R. (2007). The fall of Constantinople: the Ottoman conquest of Byzantium. Osprey Publishing. pp. 189–. ISBN 978-1-84603-200-4.
- Philippides, Marios (2007). Mehmed II the Conqueror and the fall of the Franco-Byzantine Levant to the Ottoman Turks: some western views and testimonies. ACMRS/Arizona Center for Medieval and Renaissance Studies. ISBN 978-0-86698-346-4.
- Stavrides, Théoharis (2001). The Sultan of Vezirs: The Life and Times of the Ottoman Grand Vezir Mahmud Pasha Angelovic (1453–1474). Brill. ISBN 978-90-04-12106-5.

Political offices
Preceded by Çandarlı Halil Pasha the Younger	Grand Vizier of the Ottoman Empire; 1 June 1453 – 1456	Succeeded by Mahmud Pasha Angelović
Military offices
Preceded by Yakup Bey	Kapudan Pasha; 1463–1466	Succeeded by Mahmud Pasha Angelović
