= Donald Nicol =

British Byzantinist (1923-2003)

Donald MacGillivray Nicol FBA, MRIA
- Born: 4 February 1923; Portsmouth, Hampshire, England
- Died: 23 September 2003 (aged 80); Cambridge, Cambridgeshire, England

Academic background
- Education: Pembroke College, Cambridge
- Thesis: The Despotate of Epirus, 1204–61 (1952)
- Doctoral advisor: Steven Runciman

Academic work
- Discipline: Byzantine studies
- Institutions: University College Dublin (1952–64); University of Edinburgh (1966–70); King's College London (1970–88)
- Doctoral students: Ruth Macrides, Paul Magdalino
- Main interests: Byzantine and modern Greek language and literature
- Notable works: The Last Centuries of Byzantium, 1261–1453

Donald MacGillivray Nicol, FBA, MRIA (4 February 1923 – 25 September 2003) was an English Byzantinist.

== Life ==
Nicol was born in Portsmouth, Hampshire, to a Church of Scotland minister, and received a classical education at King Edward VII School in Sheffield and St Paul's School in London. Registering as a conscientious objector in 1941, he served in 1942–1946 in the Friends' Ambulance Unit, with which he first visited Greece in 1944–1945, visiting Ioannina and the Meteora monasteries.

After his wartime experiences, Nicol matriculated at Pembroke College, Cambridge, to read classics, graduating in 1949. He then returned to Greece in 1949–1950 as a member of the British School at Athens. During this time, he also visited Mount Athos, spending Easter 1949 at the Hilandar Monastery, and revisited Meteora. In 1950, Nicol married Joan Mary Campbell, with whom he had three sons. He completed his doctoral thesis at Cambridge in 1952. The thesis, on the medieval Despotate of Epirus, led to his first book, The Despotate of Epiros. His thesis supervisor was Steven Runciman, with whom Nicol formed a lifelong friendship, nurtured in the Athenaeum Club.

On completion of his doctorate, Nicol's first academic posting was as Lecturer in Classics at the University College Dublin from 1952 to 1964. He spent 1964–1966 as visiting fellow at Dumbarton Oaks, and was then Senior Lecturer and Reader in Byzantine History, University of Edinburgh (1966–1970). In 1970 he was named to the historic chair of Koraës Professor of Modern Greek and Byzantine History, Language and Literature at the King's College London, a post he held until 1988. In 1977–1980 he was Assistant Principal of the King's College, and Vice-Principal in 1980–1981. He was the founding editor of Byzantine and Modern Greek Studies journal (1975), whose publication he oversaw until 1983, and served as president of the Ecclesiastical History Society in 1975–1976. In 1989–1992, he was director of the Gennadius Library (Γεννάδειος Βιβλιοθήκη) in Athens.

Nicol became a member of the Royal Irish Academy in 1960, President of the Ecclesiastical History Society (1975–76) and a Fellow of the British Academy in 1981. For his contributions to the history of medieval Epirus, the city of Arta made him an honorary citizen in 1990, and he was awarded an honorary doctorate by the University of Ioannina in 1997. He died in Cambridge in 2003.

== Works ==
- Nicol, Donald M. (1957). The Despotate of Epiros (1. ed.). Oxford: Blackwell.
  - Nicol, Donald M. (1984) [1957]. The Despotate of Epiros 1267-1479: A Contribution to the History of Greece in the Middle Ages (2. ed.). Cambridge: Cambridge University Press. ISBN 9780521261906.
- Nicol, Donald M. (1968). The Byzantine Family of Kantakouzenos (Cantacuzenus) ca. 1100-1460: A Genealogical and Prosopographical Study. Washington: Dumbarton Oaks Center for Byzantine Studies.
- Nicol, Donald M. (1972). Byzantium: Its Ecclesiastical History and Relations with the Western World: Collected Studies. London: Variorum. ISBN 9780902089358.
- Nicol, Donald M. (1975). Meteora: The Rock Monasteries of Thessaly. London: Variorum. ISBN 9780902089730.
- Nicol, Donald M. (1972). The Last Centuries of Byzantium, 1261-1453 (1. ed.). London: Rupert Hart-Davis. ISBN 9780246105592.
  - Nicol, Donald M. (1993) [1972]. The Last Centuries of Byzantium, 1261-1453 (2. ed.). Cambridge: Cambridge University Press. ISBN 9780521439916.
- Nicol, Donald M. (1979). The End of the Byzantine Empire. New York: Holmes & Meier Publishers. ISBN 9780841906617.
- Nicol, Donald M. (1979). Church and Society in the Last Centuries of Byzantium. Cambridge: Cambridge University Press. ISBN 9780521224383.
- Nicol, Donald M. (1988). Byzantium and Venice: A Study in Diplomatic and Cultural Relations (1. ed.). Cambridge: Cambridge University Press. ISBN 9780521341578.
  - Nicol, Donald M. (1992) [1988]. Byzantium and Venice: A Study in Diplomatic and Cultural Relations (2. ed.). Cambridge: Cambridge University Press. ISBN 978-0-521-42894-1.
- Nicol, Donald M. (1990). Joannes Gennadios, the Man: A Biographical Sketch. Athens: American School of Classical Studies.
- Nicol, Donald M. (1991). A Biographical Dictionary of the Byzantine Empire. London: Seaby. ISBN 978-1-85264-048-4.
- Nicol, Donald M. (1992). The Immortal Emperor: The Life and Legend of Constantine Palaiologos, Last Emperor of the Romans (1. ed.). Cambridge: Cambridge University Press. ISBN 978-0-521-41456-2.
  - Nicol, Donald M. (2002) [1992]. The Immortal Emperor: The Life and Legend of Constantine Palaiologos, Last Emperor of the Romans (2. ed.). Cambridge: Cambridge University Press. ISBN 978-0-521-89409-8.
- Nicol, Donald M. (1994). The Byzantine Lady: Ten Portraits, 1250-1500 (1. ed.). Cambridge: Cambridge University Press.
  - Nicol, Donald M. (1996) [1994]. The Byzantine Lady: Ten Portraits, 1250-1500 (2. ed.). Cambridge-New York: Cambridge University Press.
- Nicol, Donald M. (1996). The Reluctant Emperor: A Biography of John Cantacuzene, Byzantine Emperor and Monk, c. 1295-1383 (1. ed.). Cambridge: Cambridge University Press.
  - Nicol, Donald M. (2002) [1996]. The Reluctant Emperor: A Biography of John Cantacuzene, Byzantine Emperor and Monk, c. 1295-1383 (2. ed.). Cambridge: Cambridge University Press.
- Nicol, Donald M., ed. (1997). Theodore Spandounes: On the Origins of the Ottoman Emperors. Cambridge: Cambridge University Press. ISBN 9780521585101.
