= Alexia (given name) =

- Gender: Female
- Language: Greek

Origin
- Meaning: Man's Defender
- Region of origin: Greece

Other names
- Nicknames: Lex; Lexi
- See also: Alex; Alexander; Alexandra; Lexi

Alexia is a female form of the Greek male given name Alexis that in turn is a variant form of the Latin name Alexius.

The name Alexis became popular in the United States in the 20th century, when actress Alexis Smith began appearing in films; however, Alexia is still used as well. Notable people with the name include:

- Alexia (Italian singer) (born 1967)
- Alexia Apostolakis (born 2006), Australian soccer player
- Alexia Bonatsos (born 1982), American venture capitalist and former co-editor of TechCrunch
- Alexia Bryn (1889–1983), Norwegian pair skater
- Alexia Coley, English singer-songwriter
- Alexia Dechaume-Balleret (born 1970), French tennis player
- Alexia Djilali, French volleyballer
- Alexia Fast (born 1982), Canadian actress
- Alexia González-Barros González (1971–1985), child declared Venerable by Pope Francis
- Alexia Hilbertidou, New Zealand social entrepreneur
- Alexia Kelley, director of the Department of Health and Human Services' Center for Faith-Based and Neighborhood Partnerships
- Alexia Khadime (born 1983), British singer and actress
- Alexia Kourtelesi, Greek judoka
- Alexia Kyriazi, Greek rhythmic gymnast
- Alexia Massalin, American computer scientist and programmer
- Alexia Mupende (1984–2019), Rwandese model, actress and fitness expert
- Alexia Portal, French actress
- Alexia Putellas, midfielder for FC Barcelona Femení and Spain women's national football team
- Alexia Rotsidou (born 1966), Cypriot volleyball coach, former international athlete, and politician
- Alexia Robinson (actress) (born 1960), American TV actress
- Alexia Arisarah Schenkel (born 1996), Thai alpine skier
- Alexia Smirli (born 1983), Greek shooter
- Alexia Walker (born 1982), English cricketer
- Aléxia Zuberer (born 1972), Swiss-French ski mountaineer, ski instructor, and mountain guide
- Princess Alexia of the Netherlands (born 2005)
- Princess Alexia of Greece and Denmark (born 1965)
- Alexia Midgar (アレクシア・ミドガル), a fictional character and princess in the light novel and anime series The Eminence in Shadow
- Alexia Murtaugh, a fictional character in the webcomic Schlock Mercenary
- Alexia Bohwim (born 1969), Norwegian author

== See also ==
- Alessia (given name)
- Alexia (disambiguation)
- Alexias (fl. 4th century BC), Greek physician
