= Alexius =

- Gender: Male
- Language: Greek

Other names
- See also: Alexia (female); Alexey

Alexius is the Latinized form of the given name Alexios (Greek: Αλέξιος, polytonic Ἀλέξιος, "defender", cf. Alexander), especially common in the Byzantine Empire. The female form is Alexia (Greek: Αλεξία) and its variants such as Alessia (the masculine form of which is Alessio) in Italian. The surname Lex derives from Alexius.

The name belongs to the most ancient attested Greek names (a-re-ke-se-u in the Linear B tablets KN Df 1229 and MY Fu 718).

== Rulers ==
- Alexios I Komnenos (1048–1118), Byzantine emperor
- Alexios II Komnenos (1167–1183), Byzantine emperor
- Alexios III, Byzantine emperor
- Alexios IV, Byzantine emperor
- Alexios V Doukas, Byzantine emperor
- Alexios I of Trebizond, Emperor of Trebizond
- Alexios II of Trebizond, Emperor of Trebizond
- Alexios III of Trebizond, Emperor of Trebizond
- Alexios IV of Trebizond, Emperor of Trebizond
- Alexios V of Trebizond, Emperor of Trebizond
- Alexius Mikhailovich (1629–1676), Tsar of Russia
- Alexius Petrovich (1690–1718), Russian tsarevich

== Religious figures ==
- Alexius, Metropolitan of Moscow (1354–1378)
- Patriarch Alexius I of Constantinople (1025–1043)
- Alexius (c. 1425–1488), Russian archpriest who converted to Judaism
- Patriarch Alexius I of Moscow and All Russia (r. 1945–1970)
- Patriarch Alexius II of Moscow and All Russia (r. 1990–2008)
- Alexius of Nicaea, metropolitan bishop
- Saint Alexius of Rome, fifth-century eastern saint

== Other ==
- Alexios Apokaukos, Byzantine statesman
- Alexios Aspietes, Byzantine governor
- Alexios Branas, Byzantine general
- Alexios Halebian, American tennis player
- Alexius Meinong, Austrian philosopher
- Alexios Mosele (Caesar), Byzantine heir-apparent
- Alexios Palaiologos (despot), Byzantine heir-apparent
- Alexios Philanthropenos, Byzantine general
- Alexios Raoul (protovestiarios), Byzantine general
- Alexios Strategopoulos, Byzantine general
- Alexios Xiphias, Byzantine Catepan of Italy
- Alexios (Assassin's Creed), a fictional character in Assassin's Creed: Odyssey

== Alexius in other languages ==
- English – Alexis, Aleck
- German – Alexius, Alexis
- Greek – Αλέξιος [Alexios], Αλέξης [Alexis]
- French – Alexis
- Italian – Alessio
- Spanish – Alejo, Alexis
- Portuguese – Aleixo
- Latvian – Alexius, Aleksis, Aleksejs
- Polish – Aleksy
- Czech – Aleš, Alexej
- Slovak – Aleš
- Estonian – Aleksei
- Bulgarian – Алексей [Aleksej]
- Serbian – Aleksa
- Finnish – Aleksi, Aleksis
- Macedonian – Aleksio
- Georgian – ალექსი, [Aleksi ]
- Belarusian – Аляксей [Alaksiej, Aliaksiej, Alyaksyey]
- Russian – Алексей [Alexei, Alexey, Aleksei, Aleksey], Алексий [Alexiy], Алёша [Alyosha], Лёша [Lyosha]
- Ukrainan – Олексій [Oleksii, Oleksiy, Olexij], Олекса [Oleksa, Olexa]
- Hungarian – Elek
- Catalan – Aleix
