= Alexander of Trebizond =

Alexander Megas Komnenos
- Emperor and Autocrat of all the East and Perateia

Trapezuntine emperor
- Reign: c. 1451–1459
- Born: c. 1405; Trebizond (modern-day Trabzon, Turkey)
- Died: c. 1459 (aged c. 54); Trebizond (modern-day Trabzon, Turkey)
- Spouse: Maria Gattilusio
- Issue: Alexios V Megas Komnenos
- Dynasty: Komnenos
- Father: Alexios IV Megas Komnenos
- Mother: Theodora Kantakouzene

Alexander Megas Komnenos (Greek: Ἀλέξανδρος Μέγας Κομνηνός, romanized: Alexandros Megas Komnēnos; c. 1405–1459), also recorded as Skantarios (Greek: Σκαντάριος), was co-emperor of the Empire of Trebizond alongside his elder brother John IV Megas Komnenos c. 1451–1459. Alexander was the second son of the Trapezuntine emperor Alexios IV Megas Komnenos. John was exiled after a failed rebellion against their father in c. 1426, and Alexios made Alexander the designated heir. John returned to Trebizond in early 1429 and seized the throne, killing Alexios and forcing Alexander into exile.

While in exile, Alexander lived in Constantinople, as his sister Maria had married the Byzantine emperor John VIII Palaiologos. Alexander attempted to gain Byzantine and Genoese support in organizing an expedition to depose John and take the Trapezuntine throne for himself, but had little success. In late 1437, Alexander married Maria Gattilusio, daughter of Dorino I Gattilusio, the lord of Lesbos, also in an attempt to gain allies for the fight against his brother. At some point, John and Alexander reconciled as Alexander once more lived in Trebizond in the 1450s. Perhaps John was motivated by the fact that he lacked sons of his own and distrusted their only other brother, David, to invite Alexander back and designate him as heir and co-emperor c. 1451. Alexander predeceased John, dying c. 1459, though his son and only known child, Alexios V Megas Komnenos, briefly succeeded John as emperor in 1460.

== Early life ==
Alexander was born in 1405 c. as the second son of Alexios IV Megas Komnenos, who ruled the Empire of Trebizond from 1417 to 1429. He had two brothers; the elder John and the younger David, and at least three sisters, one of whom was Maria, who married the Byzantine emperor John VIII Palaiologos (r. 1425–1448). In the writings of contemporary historian Laonikos Chalkokondyles, Alexander is called Skantarios, a name seemingly of Turkish origin, perhaps related to İskender, the Turkish form of Alexander. George Finlay suggested in 1851 that Alexander was called Skantarios by his contemporaries and that this indicated Turkish influence in the Greek dialect of Trebizond. Certain modern scholars, such as Michel Kuršanskis, as well as the Prosopographisches Lexikon der Palaiologenzeit, favor using the name Skantarios rather than Alexander.

As the eldest son, Alexios had initially made Alexander's brother John the designated heir, and possibly associated him with imperial power as co-emperor. Relations between Alexios IV and John deteriorated throughout Alexios's reign, owing to John's ambition and to Alexios being seen as a weak ruler. The familial issues reached a breaking point c. 1426, when John discovered that his mother (Alexios's wife) Theodora Kantakouzene was having an affair with the treasurer. John murdered the man with his own hands and then launched a palace coup, imprisoning his parents in their respective apartments in the imperial palace. Worried that John was planning to kill both of them, the Trapezuntine nobility persuaded the populace that John would make a worse ruler than Alexios, and forced him to flee the city, before releasing Alexios and Theodora. John fled to Georgia, where he married a daughter of King Alexander I (r. 1412–1442). After John's rebellion, Alexios appears to have designated his next eldest son, Alexander, as heir instead, and perhaps made him co-emperor.

John made plans to conquer Trebizond while in exile. From Georgia, he travelled to Crimea, and tried to organize an expedition against Alexios with the help of the Genoese. In the meantime, Alexios IV worked to seal alliances to ensure the safety of his empire. He appears to have negotiated with Prince Alexios of Theodoro to marry either Alexander or David to Alexios's daughter, Maria of Gothia. Any negotiations fell through when John and the Genoese landed at the port of Cordyle in early 1429. Alexios left Trebizond to march against John, but some among the Trapezuntine nobility changed their allegiance to John and on 26 April 1429, Alexios was assassinated in his tent during the night, after which John became emperor as John IV. After the assassination of Alexios and the accession of John, Alexander was exiled, fleeing to Constantinople, where he lived with his sister Maria.

== Life in exile ==
After being forced into exile, Alexander is next attested at Constantinople eight years later, in November 1437. At this time, the Spanish ambassador and traveller Pedro Tafur met Alexander and recorded that he had recently married Maria Gattilusio, daughter of Dorino I Gattilusio, the lord of Lesbos, for aid against John. Shortly thereafter, Tafur travelled to Trebizond, where he met with John. John asked Tafur about his exiled brother, inquiring whether it was true that he had married a daughter of Gattilusio were true and if rumors that Alexander had persuaded John VIII Palaiologos and the Genoese to supply him with a fleet to attack Trebizond were true. Tafur, perhaps untruthfully, said to John that both rumors were true. Though impressed, John replied that he would "know how to defend himself", after which Tafur concluded that John had sealed and alliance with the Ottoman Empire.

Tafur met with Alexander again in March 1438, when Alexander was on the island of Mytilene, one of Dorino's fiefs. Alexander was on the island together with his wife, and aimed to organize an expedition to depose John and claim the throne for himself. Tafur informed Alexander of John's alliance with the Ottomans, and that it would thus be detrimental to go to war, and at the same time, Dorino was called upon by Genoa to try to help restore peace between Alexander and John, given Genoa's business interests in trade with Trebizond. Alexander's expedition thus fell through and he disappears from the sources again for a lengthy period of time. His sister Maria died in December 1439, which would have ended Alexander's influence in Constantinople.

== Rule ==
Alexander is next attested in 1451, a turbulent year in Trebizond as relations had deteriorated between John and the Genoese, with David even having been sent on naval expeditions against them. Surprisingly, Alexander is recorded to have lived in Trebizond at this time, together with his wife Maria and their young son, Alexios. Per Michel Kuršanskis, the most likely explanation for Alexander's return home was that the childless John, wary of David, had reconciled with Alexander and had invited him back. According to Chalkondyles, Alexander was emperor; Kuršanskis states it is probable that Alexander was thus made co-emperor and designated heir.

Alexander died in Trebizond. The date of his death is not known, but he was deceased by the time of Trebizond's fall to the Ottoman Empire in 1461. As Alexander did not succeed John, and is unmentioned after John's death, it is probable that he predeceased John, dying around 1459, with his young son Alexios being designated heir in his place. The young Alexios, as Alexios V, did briefly succeed as emperor upon John's death but was nearly immediately deposed by David. Alexander's family did not fare well after the fall of the empire; his wife Maria was captured and placed in the harem of Sultan Mehmed II and their son, Alexios, at first lived with David in exile before being executed alongside David's family on 1 November 1463.

Alexander of Trebizond Komnenos dynasty Born: c. 1405 Died: c. 1459
Regnal titles
Preceded by John IV	Trapezuntine emperor c. 1451–1459 with John IV	Succeeded by John IV
