= Bagrationi, wife of John IV of Trebizond =

Bagrationi (c. 1412 – before 1438) was the first Empress consort of John IV of Trebizond. Her name is unknown.

== Family ==
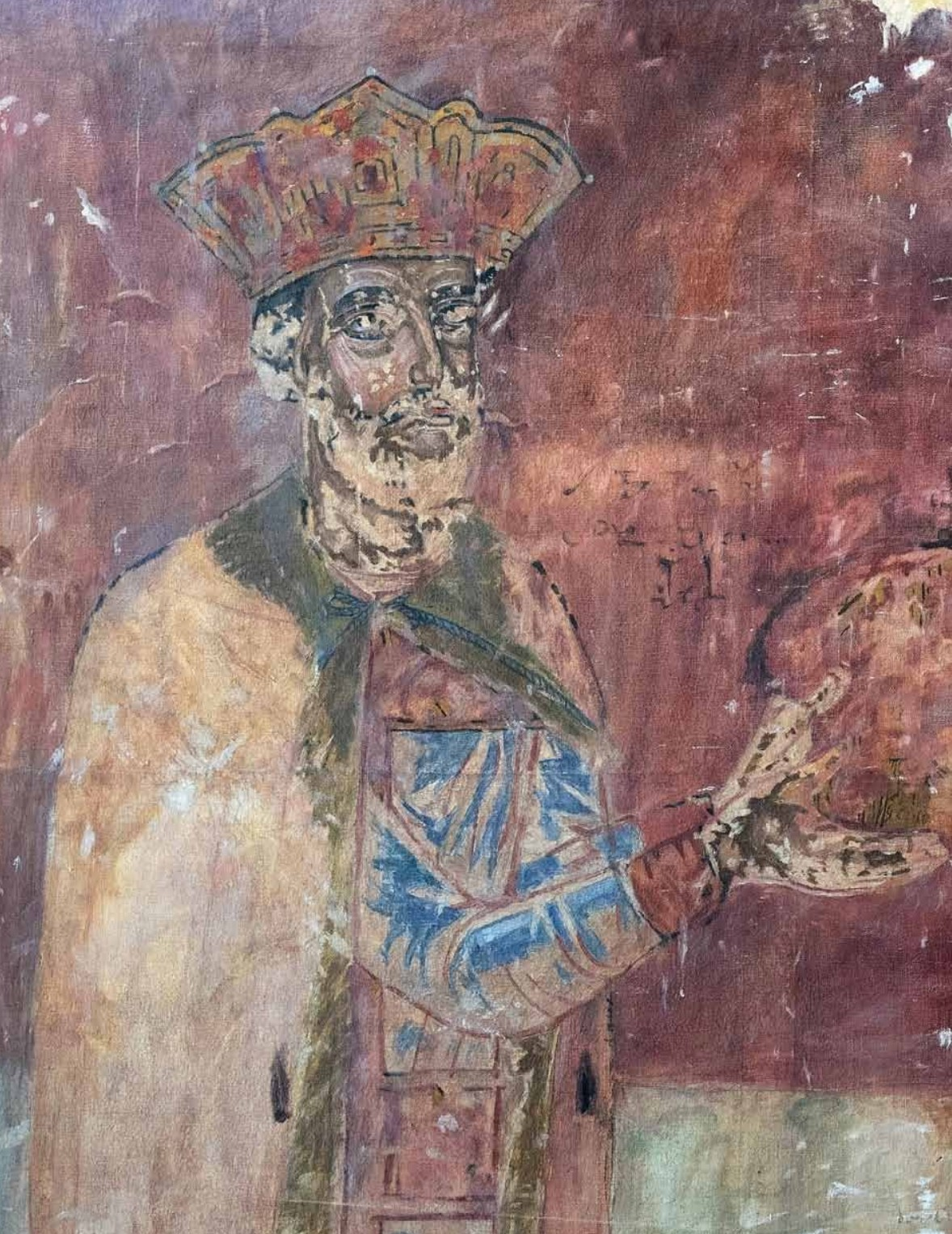
Fresco of King Alexander I of Georgia, Svetitskhoveli Cathedral.

She was a daughter of King Alexander I of Georgia and his first wife Dulandukht, the daughter of Beshken II Orbelian. Dulandukht had died or was repudiated before 1415, when Alexander married his second wife, Tamar, daughter of Alexander I of Imereti.

== Empress ==
In about 1426, she married John IV of Trebizond, the son of Emperor Alexios IV of Trebizond and Theodora Kantakouzene, who had fled from Trebizond after a violent episode. According to a passage considered to be an interpolation in the history of Laonikos Chalkokondyles, he had accused his mother Theodora of having an affair with an unnamed protovestarios, whom he killed, then held his parents captive in the citadel until the palace staff released them.

Sometime after marrying Bagrationi, John left Georgia for Caffa, where he sought to charter a large galley and its crew. By 1429 he had found one, for in that year he returned to Trebizond. Alexios IV prepared to face his son in the battlefield. John suborned some of his father's retainers, who assassinated Alexios IV while he slept. He executed the assassins of his father in order to deny any connection with them, then succeeded his father, presumably with Bagrationi as his Empress.

Their daughter Theodora Komnene was betrothed to Uzun Hasan of Aq Qoyunlu in 1457, whom she married the next year. According to Anthony Bryer, this is the "most celebrated Trapezuntine-Muslim marriage", and for which the terms of their marriage can be determined. These terms included: a dowry of properties in the villages of Halanik and Sesera; a "bride-price" in that Uzun Hasan would extend some kind of effort to help defend Trebizond; Theodora's right to continue to profess the Christian faith, keep a chaplain, and act as protector of Christians subject to Uzun Hasan; and "as it turned out, Theodora's considerable (and probably unusual) right to influence Aqqoyunlu foreign relations" Theodora's tomb in Diyarbakır was shown to an Italian visitor in 1507. Her two daughters found their way to Damascus where Caterino Zeno met them in 1512.

An account by Caterino Zeno dated to 1474 names another daughter, Eudokia-Valenza of Trebizond. This Valenza was a reported wife of Nicholas Crispo, Lord of Syros. However she is reported as having a daughter who married in 1429. John IV and her are unlikely to have been the grandparents of a married woman only three years following their own marriage. Valenza is considered likely to have been a sister of John IV, instead of a daughter. Nicholas Crispo had eleven children. According to his own correspondence, Crispo was also a son-in-law of Jacopo Gattilusio. His children could be from either of his two marriages. They included (among others) Francesco II Crispo, Duke of the Archipelago and Fiorenza Crispo, mother of Catherine Cornaro.

== Death ==
According to the Europäische Stammtafeln: Stammtafeln zur Geschichte der Europäischen Staaten (1978) by Detlev Schwennicke, she was dead by 1438. John IV went on to marry an unnamed Turkish lady. The Europäische Stammtafeln considers this second wife to have been a daughter of Dawlat Berdi. Pedro Tafur, in his travel memoirs, records that when he visited Trebizond in 1438 John IV had a Turkish wife.

== Bibliography ==
- Toumanoff, Cyril (1976). Manuel de Généalogie et de Chronologie pour l'histoire de la Caucasie chrétienne (Arménie, Géorgie, Albanie) [Manual of Genealogy and Chronology of Christian Caucasian History (Armenia, Georgia, Albania)] (in French). Rome: Edizioni Aquila.

Royal titles
Preceded by Theodora Kantakouzene	Empress consort of Trebizond; 1429 – c. 1438	Succeeded by Maria of Gothia
