= Anna Philanthropene =

Empress consort of Manuel III of Trebizond

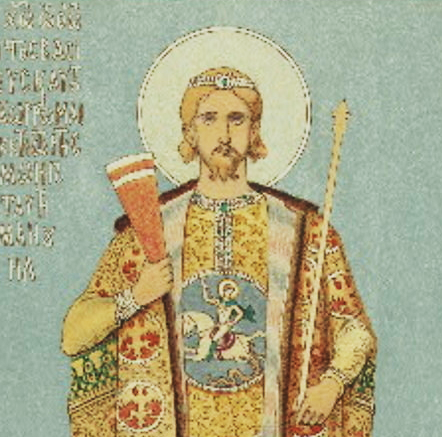
Manuel III of Trebizond

Anna Philanthropene (Greek: Άννα Φιλανθρώπινη; fl. 1395–1404) was the second Empress consort of Manuel III of Trebizond.

== Family ==
Anna was the daughter of Manuel Angelos Philanthropenos, Caesar and governor of Thessaly. Manuel ruled Thessaly from c. 1390 until it was conquered by Bayezid I of the Ottoman Empire in 1394.

Her paternal grandfather, or more likely uncle, was Alexios Angelos Philanthropenos, also a Caesar, who was governor of Thessaly from c. 1373 to 1390. Her maternal grandmother, or more likely aunt-in-law, was Maria Radoslava.

== Empress ==
Gulkhan-Eudokia of Georgia, Manuel's first wife and Empress consort of Trebizond died 2 May 1395. On 4 September of that year, Eudokia, Manuel's sister and the widow of Tadjeddin Pasha of Sinop and Emir of Limnia, arrived from Constantinople at Kordyle with Anna Philanthropene and Theodora Kantakouzene; these women had come to wed, respectively Manuel III and her nephew Alexios. The combined wedding took place the following day in Trebizond.

The ambassador to Tamerlane, Ruy Gonzáles de Clavijo met Manuel III and his family April 1404 while passing through Trebizond, and alludes to Anna Philanthropene as being alive. Manuel died on 5 March 1417; whether Anna survived him is unknown. Thierry Ganchou claims to have identified a son of Manuel and Anna, who was alive as late as 1423, and old enough to marry Eudokia, the daughter of the protostrator Manuel Palaiologos Kantakouzenos.

Royal titles
Preceded by Gulkhan-Eudokia of Georgia	Empress consort of Trebizond; 1395–c. 1417	Succeeded by Theodora Kantakouzene
