= Alexia =

Alexia may refer to:

- Alexia (given name)
  - Alexia (singer) (born 1967), Italian singer
    - Alexia (album), a 2002 album by the Italian singer
  - Alexia Putellas (born 1994), Spanish footballer sometimes known mononymously
    - Alexia: Labor Omnia Vincit, a 2022 docu-series about the footballer
- Alexia (condition) (also known as acquired dyslexia), loss of the ability to read due to cerebral disorder
  - Pure alexia, a form in which other language skills are unaffected
- Alexia Wight, an Australian plant genus, synonym of Alyxia
- Index–Alexia Alluminio, an Italian cycling team
- MV Alexia, an oil tanker converted into a merchant aircraft carrier
- Alexia or Alexia Foods, a Conagra Brands brand of frozen potato products

== See also ==
- Alexias (fl. 4th century BC), Greek physician
- Alexa (disambiguation)
- Alexius, a given name
