= Alexios Komnenos (disambiguation) =

Alexios I Komnenos was a Byzantine emperor (1081–1118).

Alexios Komnenos (Ἀλέξιος Κομνηνός) or Alexius Comnenus may also refer to:

- Alexios Komnenos (governor of Dyrrhachium), nephew of Alexios I
- Alexios Komnenos (died 1136), son of Isaac Komnenos
- Alexios Komnenos (co-emperor), son of John II Komnenos
- Alexios Komnenos (megas doux), son of Anna Komnene
- Alexios Komnenos (son of Andronikos I), illegitimate son of Andronikos I Komnenos
- Alexios Komnenos (protosebastos), grandson of John II, lover of the Empress Maria Komnene and leader of her regency council
- Alexios II Komnenos, Byzantine emperor (1180–1183)
- Alexios Komnenos (died 1188), illegitimate son of Manuel I Komnenos
- Alexios I of Trebizond, Emperor of Trebizond (1204–1222)
- Alexios II of Trebizond, Emperor of Trebizond (1297–1330)
- Alexios III of Trebizond, Emperor of Trebizond (1349–1390)
- Alexios IV of Trebizond, Emperor of Trebizond (1417–1429)
- Alexios V of Trebizond, Emperor of Trebizond (1460)
