= Alessia =

- Pronunciation: /əˈlɛsiə/ ə-LESS-ee-ə; Italian: [aˈlɛssja]
- Gender: female
- Language: Italian

Other names
- See also: Alexis, Alexius, Alexei, Alessio, Alex

Alessia is an Italian given name, the feminine form of the male given name Alessio, the Italian form of Alexius. In Greek it is Alexia. It is a popular name for females in Italy and was the second most popular name for Italian girls born in 2006. The name may mean "defending warrior". The name-day for Alessia is January 9, the day the French Catholic Saint Alix Le Clerc, who is also known as Alessia Le Clerc, died in 1622.

== Individuals with the given name ==
- Alessia Amendola (born 1984), Italian voice actress
- Alessia Amenta, Italian archaeologist and Egyptology curator at the Vatican Museums
- Alessia Baechler (born 2005), Swiss ice hockey player
- Alessia Barela (born 1974), Italian actress
- Alessia Berra (born 1994), Italian Paralympic swimmer
- Alessia Cara (born 1996), Canadian singer-songwriter
- Alessia Dipol (born 1995), Italian-Togolese alpine skier
- Alessia Fabiani (born 1976) Italian model, showgirl and TV presenter
- Alessia Ferrari (born 1989), Italian water polo referee
- Alessia Filippi (born 1987), Italian swimmer
- Alessia Gatti (born 2002), Italian bobsledder
- Alessia Gennari (born 1991), Italian volleyball player
- Alessia Leclerc, French Catholic Saint (also known as Alix Leclerc)
- Alessia Leolini (born 1997), Italian artistic gymnast
- Alessia Mancini (born 1978), Italian television host, television personality, actress, and showgirl
- Alessia Marcuzzi (born 1972), Italian television host and actress
- Alessia Merz (born 1974), Italian model, television host and showgirl
- Alessia Morani (born 1976), Italian politician
- Alessia Mosca (born 1975), Italian politician
- Alessia Nobilio (born 2001), Italian golfer
- Alessia Orro (born 1998), Italian volleyball player
- Alessia Patuelli (born 2002), Italian racing cyclist
- Alessia Pavese (born 1998), Italian sprinter
- Alessia Pilani (born 1999), Italian rugby union player
- Alessia Riner (born 2004), Swiss handball player
- Alessia Rotta (born 1975), Italian politician
- Alessia Rovegno (born 1998), Peruvian model, actress, singer, and beauty pageant titleholder who was crowned Miss Peru 2022
- Alessia Russo (born 1999), English footballer
- Alessia Russo (gymnast) (born 1996), Italian gymnast
- Alessia Santeramo (1998), Italian chess player
- Alessia Succo (born 2009), Italian sprint hurdler
- Alessia Tornaghi (born 2003), Italian figure skater
- Alessia Tuttino (born 1983), Italian football midfielder
- Alessia Verstappen (born 2006), Belgian rhythmic gymnast
- Alessia Zarbo (born 2001), French runner
- Alessia Zecchini (born 1992), Italian free-diver
