= Saint-Alexis =

Saint-Alexis may refer to the following places in Canada:

- Saint-Alexis, Quebec, part of which was formerly Saint-Alexis-de-Montcalm
- Saint-Alexis-de-Matapédia, Quebec
- Saint-Alexis-des-Monts, Quebec

== See also ==
- Alexis (disambiguation)
- Sant'Alessio (disambiguation)
- Alexius of Rome, or Saint Alexis
