= Circassian raid on Trebizond =

Circassian raid against Trebizond in 1458

- Part of Circassian raids
Date	1458
Location	Trebizond, Empire of Trebizond
Result	Circassian victory
Territorial changes	Temporary Circassian occupation of Trebizond

Belligerents
Empire of Trebizond	Circassia

Commanders and leaders
John IV Megas Komnenos; Unknown commander †	(Circassia) Artabil

Strength
Unknown	Unknown

Casualties and losses
~300 killed	Unknown

The Circassian raid on Trebizond was a military assault carried out by a Circassian fleet under the command of Artabil against the Empire of Trebizond in 1458, during a period of instability on the Black Sea coast. The city was temporarily captured, while the commander of the Trebizond army, his son, and several hundred people were reportedly killed during the attack.

== History ==
According to the Byzantine historian Laonikos Chalkokondyles, in 1458 a large Circassian fleet including some Greeks led by a Circassian commander named Artabil approached the city of Trebizond to capture and plunder the city.

Emperor John gathered his army from both the land and the sea with his commanders, came to the Monastery of St. Phocas. The Trebizond army set out by sea to attack the Circassians but Artabil captured a location named the Pass of Meleari which is called Capanius. The Trebizond army planned to attack Artabil with the assist of the fleet, but the prepeared Trebizond fleet unable to embark at the right time due to bad weather conditions, thus the Circassians attacked first, killed the commander of the army and his son. Some of the Trebizond army began to escape to the city by land and the remainings by sea via a ship including the emperor.

Artabil set up a camp in the Monastery of St. Phocas for 3 days. The Circassians captured some of the escapees from the monastery including an emperor's servant and messenger Mavrokostas executed. A huge fire broke out in the city of Trebizond and the people began to evacuate the city, thinking that it was started by traitors trying to please the Circassians. The magistrates of the city also fled and took refuge in the Kingdom of Iberia.

The Circassians captured the city, the city's magistrates surrendered Trebizond without significant resistance, and the Circassians advanced further inland. (Note: The Circassians captured Trebizond, killed the Greek commander, his son, and another 300 people. The magistrates of the city surrendered Trebizond to the Circassians, who then advanced further into the country. Tsar John fled by ship. After the Circassians left, the magistrates, who had fled to Iberia and other places, returned to the city, and Tsar John called them women, cowards, and traitors to their homeland.)

Emperor John IV, who managed to escape by sea, later returned after the Circassians withdrew. Upon his return, he reportedly denounced the magistrates who had fled to Iberia and other regions during the attack, calling them cowards and traitors.

Taking advantage of the chaos, Chiteres, the governor of Amaesia, attacked the city of Trebizond and took 2,000 prisoners, but the city was largely evacuated.
