= Maria Komnene (daughter of Alexios IV) =

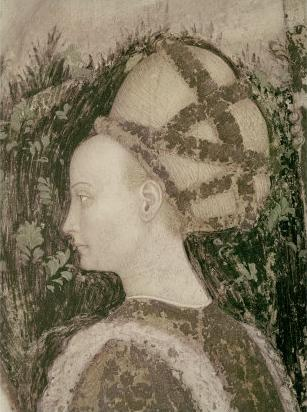
- Possible depiction of Maria in the fresco Saint George and the Princess by Pisanello

Byzantine Empress consort
- Tenure: September 1427 – 17 December 1439
- Born: 1404; Trebizond (modern-day Trabzon, Turkey)
- Died: 17 December 1439 (aged 34–35); Constantinople (modern-day Istanbul, Turkey)
- Burial: Pantokrator monastery
- Spouse: John VIII Palaiologos (m. 1427)
- Dynasty: Komnenos
- Father: Alexios IV of Trebizond
- Mother: Theodora Kantakouzene
- Religion: Christianity

Maria Megale Komnene (Greek: Μαρία Μεγάλη Κομνηνή; 1404 – 17 December 1439), known as Maria of Trebizond (Greek: Μαρία της Τραπεζούντος), was Byzantine Empress by marriage to the Byzantine emperor John VIII Palaiologos (r. 1425–1448). She was the last crowned Byzantine empress.

She was one of the daughters of Alexios IV of Trebizond and Theodora Kantakouzene.

== Life ==
In September 1427, Maria was married to John VIII Palaiologos by Patriarch Joseph II in Constantinople, having arrived by ship from Trebizond on the last day of August; the connection had been negotiated through ambassadors sent from Constantinople the previous year. The Ecthesis Chronica calls her Maria Katakouzene (Katakouzene was a variant of Kantakouzene) and extols her exceptional beauty which caused John VIII to love her dearly.

Bertrandon de la Brocquière, who saw her in Constantinople in 1432, likewise praised her beauty stating, "I should not have had a fault to find with her had she not been painted, and assuredly she had not any need of it."

The Spanish traveller Pero Tafur met Maria in November 1437 when he visited Constantinople and gave a glimpse into her daily life. During his stay at Constantinople, Tafur found she often went hunting in the adjacent countryside, either alone or with the Emperor. He adds that he met her elder brother, Alexander, in that city, where he lived "in exile with his sister, the empress, and they say that his relations with her are dishonest." When Pero Tafur returned to Constantinople a few months later, he asked to be shown the Hagia Sophia; his hosts included not only the Despot Constantine but Maria and her brother Alexander, all of whom had wanted to hear Mass there.

Maria's marriage with John lasted twelve years but resulted in no children. Sphrantzes records the date of her death while John was away in Italy at the Council of Florence; Steven Runciman attributed her death to bubonic plague. She was buried in the church of the Pantokrator monastery in Constantinople. John Eugenikos, brother of Mark Eugenikos of Ephesus, composed a lament for her death.

After Maria's death, John never remarried and died childless on 31 October 1448. He was succeeded by his younger brother, Constantine XI, who became the last Emperor. Constantine was a widower when he ascended to the throne and never married again, leaving Maria the previous empress.

== Primary sources ==
- Doukas, History
- George Sphrantzes, Chronicle

Maria Komnene (daughter of Alexios IV) Komnenos Born: ? Died: 1439
Royal titles
Preceded by Sophia of Montferrat	Byzantine Empress consort 1427–1439	None; Fall of Constantinople
