= Sant'Alessio =

Sant'Alessio may refer to:

== Places ==
- Sant'Alessio (Lucca), a parish of the Roman Catholic Archdiocese of Lucca
- Sant'Alessio in Aspromonte, a municipality in Reggio Calabria, Calabria, Italy
- Sant'Alessio Siculo, a municipality in Messina, Sicily, Italy
- Sant'Alessio con Vialone, a municipality in Pavia, Lombardy, Italy

== Other uses ==
- Il Sant'Alessio, a 1631 opera by Stefano Landi
- Madonna di sant'Alessio, an icon of the Blessed Virgin in the Basilica of the Saints Bonifacio and Alexis, Rome, Italy
- Ritmo di Sant'Alessio, a late twelfth-century metrical vita of the legendary saint Alexius of Rome
- Santi Bonifacio ed Alessio, a church in Rome, Italy
- Sant'Alessio, a 1710 oratorium by Camilla de Rossi

== See also ==
- Alessio (disambiguation)
- Saint-Alexis (disambiguation)
