= Alessio (disambiguation) =

Alessio is an Italian male given name, and also surname. It may also refer to:

== Places ==
- Italian name for Lezhë, which was also often used in other languages before WW II

== Other ==
- Santi Bonifacio ed Alessio, a basilica in Rome
- Alessio–Bianchi, an Italian professional cycling team
- Alessio (wheels), an Italian alloy wheels manufacturer and Italian professional cycling team

== See also ==
- Alessia, a given name
- D'Alessio, a surname
- Sant'Alessio (disambiguation)
