= Catholics in Alliance for the Common Good =

Defunct U.S. Catholic social justice nonprofit

Catholics in Alliance for the Common Good (CACG) was a non-partisan, Catholic, non-profit 501(c)(3) organization in the United States, which according to its website aimed to promote "the fullness of the Catholic social tradition in the public square". The organization was founded in 2005 by Alexia Kelley and Tom Perriello. It was mentioned in the Podesta emails as an example of an organization created to support progressive Catholic values. In 2010, it announced that its offices were closed, most of its activities had ceased, and all staff had moved on to other jobs. In 2013 Christopher Jolly Hale was hired as a new executive director, but in 2017 the group was dissolved.

== See also ==
- Social justice
- Christian left
- Catholic Church and politics
