= The Death of Saint Alexius =

1638 oil on canvas painting by Pietro da Cortona

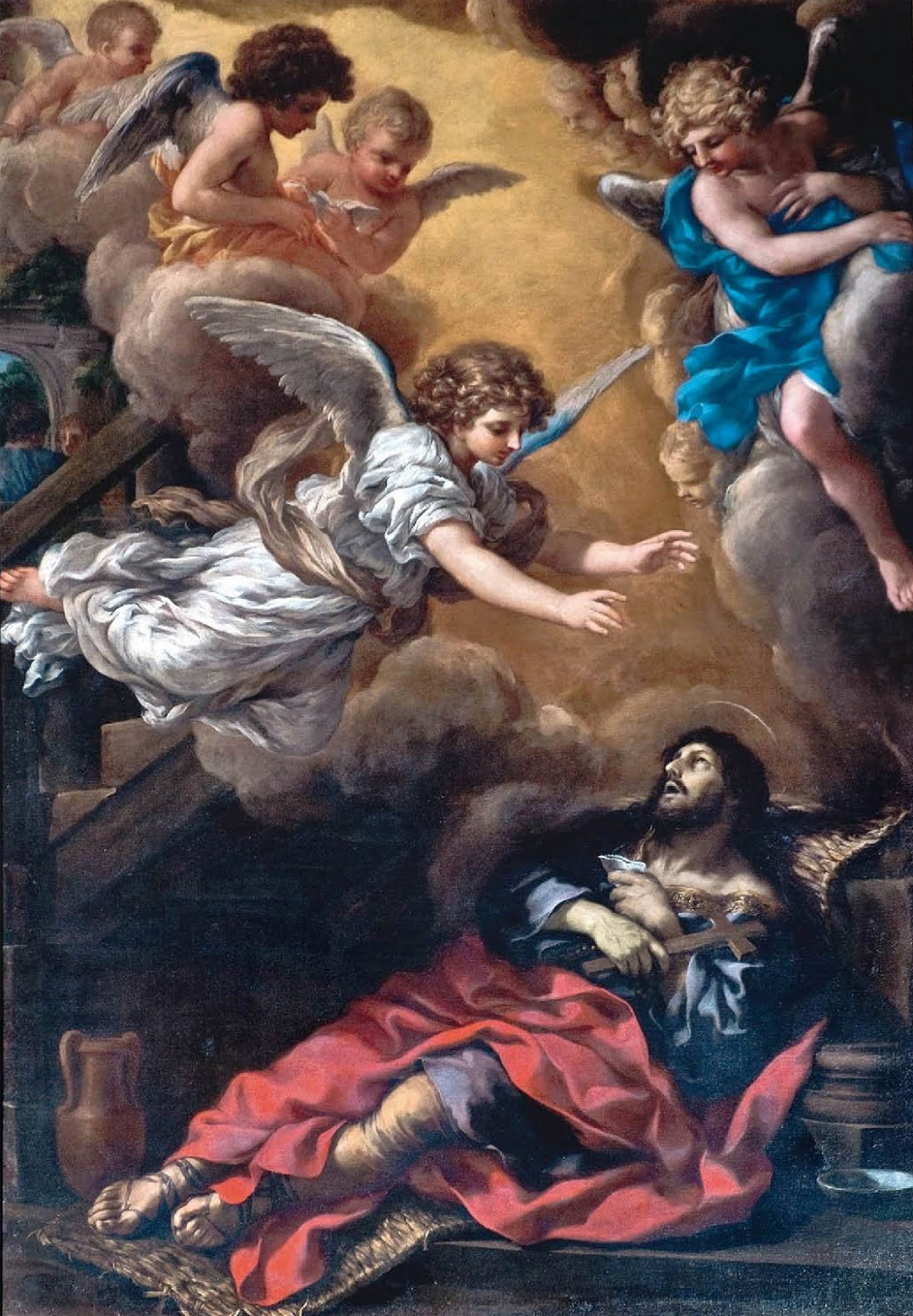
The Death of Saint Alexius (c. 1638) by Pietro da Cortona

The Death of Saint Alexius or Saint Alexius Dying is an oil on canvas painting by Pietro da Cortona, created c. 1638. It is held in the Saint Alexis chapel in the Girolamini, Naples. It shows the dying saint Alexius of Rome holding a letter welcomed by angels — he had left his family and returned to them at the moment of his death, with them only recognising him thanks to the letter.

== History ==
It was commissioned by Anna Colonna, wife of Taddeo Barberini, nephew of pope Urban VIII, and later given to the Oratorians of Naples with other relics and precious objects. The Barberini family had a particular devotion to Alexius, so much so that the opening show at their Palazzo's theatre was a sacred drama on that saint's life written by Giulio Rospigliosi with sets designed by da Cortona. Anna Colonna was deeply linked with the Oratorians' founder Philip Neri, owning a small bone of his in a reliquary by Alessandro Algardi, which she later gave to the Oratory in Naples. Da Cortona was also highly devoted to the Barberini family and the Oratorians in Rome, painting frescoes at the gallery of their palazzo (1633—1639) and working on the sacristy of the Oratorians' chiesa Nuova in Rome, later returning to the latter in 1648—1665 to take part in decorating the church.

The painting was installed in Anna's private chapel and completed economically by the Oratorians with wooden and stucco decorations imitating marble. Mario Borrelli records a transcription of a contract for Francesco Solimena to decorate the chapel and produce paintings for it — that lacked the family coat of arms and the presence of very little furniture in it suggests that the contract was not concluded or that it was resolved by him and the Oratorians.
