= Theodora Kantakouzene (wife of Alexios IV of Trebizond) =

Empress consort of Trebizond
- Tenure: 5 March 1417 – 12 November 1426
- Predecessor: Anna Philanthropene
- Successor: Bagrationi
- Born: c. 1382; Constantinople (modern-day Istanbul, Turkey)
- Died: 12 November 1426 (aged 43–44)
- Spouse: Alexios IV of Trebizond
- Issue: Elena of Trebizond; A daughter who married Jahan Shah; John IV of Trebizond; Maria of Trebizond; Alexander of Trebizond; David of Trebizond; Theodora of Trebizond disputed Eudoksia Valenza of Trebizond disputed
Names
- Theodora Kantakouzene Megale Komnene
- Dynasty: Kantakouzenos
- Father: Theodore Palaiologos Kantakouzenos disputed
- Mother: Helena Ouresina Doukina disputed

Theodora Kantakouzene Megale Komnene (died 12 November 1426) was the Empress consort of Alexios IV of Trebizond. Said to be very beautiful, according to the chronicle of Laonikos Chalkokondyles, she was accused by her son, John Megas Komnenos, of having an affair with the protovestiarios of the court of Trebizond; however, other accounts describe her as a faithful and loving wife, who kept the peace between Alexios and his sons. In either case, during her lifetime their son John fled to Georgia and did not return until after Theodora's death.

== Family ==
Theodora's parentage is described by the Byzantinist Donald Nicol as "obscure". The Ecthesis Chronica implies she was the daughter of a holder of the military rank of protostrator, and Nicol notes there are chronological grounds against identifying her father with one Manuel Kantakouzenos who was sent on a diplomatic mission to Sultan Mehmet I in the winter of 1420–1421.

However, Thierry Ganchou has provided evidence that indicates Theodora was the oldest daughter of Theodore Palaiologos Kantakouzenos, uncle of emperor Manuel II Palaiologos, and Helena Ouresina Doukina, and names her brothers in order of birth as Demetrios, protostrator Manuel, George, megas domestikos Andronikos, and Thomas. He argues that this evidence was ignored due to undue reliance on the writings of Theodore Spandounes, who wrote long after more reliable contemporary sources.

== Life ==
Born in Constantinople around 1382, Theodora was only thirteen when she became in 1395, the consort of the co-emperor Alexios IV of Trebizond, who was approximately the same age. She became ruling empress when her husband became sole emperor in Trebizond at the death of her father-in-law the emperor Manuel III, in 1417.

A passage in the History of Chalkokondyles states that Theodora became the mistress of the protovestiarios of the court of Trebizond, an act of adultery which provoked her son, John IV, to murder the official then imprison his parents in the palace. His parents were rescued by the archons of the city who sent John into exile in Georgia. However this passage is considered to be one of several interpolations into Chalkokondyles' History; a scribe in one line of the text's transmission notes the difference in style, adding a note at the beginning of the passage that "this seems to have been written by someone other than Laonikos", and at the end of the passage ends another note reading "from here on it is Laonikos". Further, the story is contradicted by the chronology and other sources. It may be the writer of this story has confused with an earlier affair between a member of the imperial dynasty of Trebizond and a protovestiarios, namely Manuel III, the father-in-law of Theodora. This scandal is reported by the Spanish traveller Ruy Gonzáles de Clavijo, who visited Trebizond in 1404 not long after the event. He adds that this scandalous relationship induced the young Alexios IV, Theodora's husband, to rebel against his father Manuel.

Manuel III died on 5 March 1417. Alexios IV succeeded him with Theodora as his Empress consort. She remained Empress for nearly a decade to her own death at the third hour of the night. Theodora was buried in the Church of Theotokos Chrysokephalos in the cemetery of Gidon with the other Emperors of Trebizond.

It appears that it was only after the death of Theodora (1426) that John IV rebelled against his father, because his late mother could no longer mediate the increasing rivalry between father and son. On the contrary, the virtue, the piety, and the fidelity of Theodora are celebrated by her compatriot, the scholar Basilios Bessarion, in the three monodies he dedicated to his benefactress, and in a special discourse of consolation addressed to Alexios IV, devastated by the death of his beloved empress. Last but not least, John IV himself, after his accession to the throne in 1429, paid homage to the virtues of his deceased mother in a chrysobull benefiting the convent she founded.

== Issue ==
Theodora married Emperor Alexios IV with whom she had six known children:

- Elena of Trebizond (c. 1395–1410), who married despot Đurađ Branković of Serbia, as his first wife
- A daughter, who married Jahan Shah of the Kara Koyunlu
- John IV of Trebizond (c. 1403–1460).
- Maria of Trebizond (c. 1404–1439); married John VIII Palaiologos.
- Alexander of Trebizond, co-emperor with his father; married Maria Gattilusio, a daughter of Dorino of Lesbos.
- David of Trebizond (c. 1408–1463).

Two further daughters have been attributed to Alexios and her by later genealogists. Michel Kuršanskis has argued these marriages never really happened, and their existence is based on a misreading of an interpolation to Chalcondyles. These daughters are:

- Theodora of Trebizond, presumed wife of Ali Beg of the Ak Koyunlu. There is not mention of this marriage in any contemporany source. It is possible that she was confused with Theodora Despina, daughter of John IV and wife of Uzun Hassan, son of Ali Beg. An other option was that the Alexios' Theodora was married instead Osman Beg, father of Ali.
- Eudoksia Valenza of Trebizond, wife of Niccolò Crispo, Lord of Syros. She was proposed as the daughter of Alexios when Ambassador Caterino Zeno's claim in his notes that she was the daughter of John IV proved to be false or an his error. Other historians argue instead that she was a Genoese woman.

Royal titles
Preceded by Anna Philanthropene	Empress consort of Trebizond; 1417–1426 with Maria Gattilusio (?–1426)	Succeeded by Bagrationi
