= Alexius of Rome =

Greek Christian monk

Saint Alexius of Rome
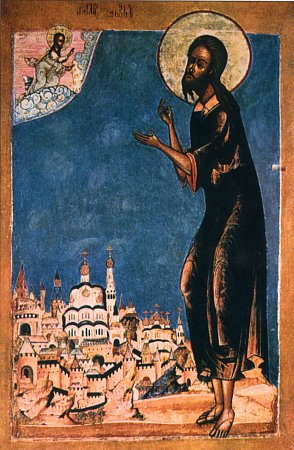

Confessor
- Born: 4th century Rome, Roman Empire
- Died: 5th century Rome, Roman Empire
- Venerated in: Catholic Church; Eastern Orthodox Church; Oriental Orthodoxy
- Canonized: Pre-Congregation
- Major shrine: Monastery of Agia Lavra, Kalavryta Pastelera Rio Grande Zacatecas
- Feast: 17 July in the West; 17 March in the East
- Attributes: holding a ladder; man lying beneath a staircase
- Patronage: Alexians; beggars; belt makers; nurses; pilgrims; travellers; Kalavryta

Saint Alexius of Rome or Alexius of Edessa (Greek: Ἀλέξιος, Alexios), also Alexis, was a fourth-century Greek monk who lived in anonymity and is known for his dedication to Christ. Two versions of his life exist, one in Syriac and the other in Greek.

== Syriac version ==
According to Syriac tradition, St. Alexius was an Eastern saint whose veneration was later transplanted to Rome. The relocation of the veneration to Rome was facilitated by the belief that the saint was a native of Rome and had died there. This Roman connection stemmed from an earlier Syriac legend, which recounted that, during the episcopate of Bishop Rabbula (412–435), a "Man of God", who lived in Edessa, Mesopotamia as a beggar and shared the alms he received with other poor people, was found to be a native of Rome after his death.

== Greek version ==
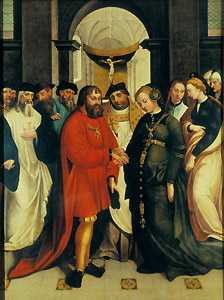
The Wedding of Saint Alexius; Garcia Fernandes, 1541.

The Greek version of his legend made Alexius the only son of Euphemianus, a wealthy Christian Roman of the senatorial class. Alexius fled his arranged marriage to follow his holy vocation. Disguised as a beggar, he lived near Edessa in Syria, accepting alms even from his own household slaves, who had been sent to look for him; they did not recognize him until a miraculous icon of the Blessed Virgin Mary (later this image was called Madonna of St Alexius) singled him out as a "Man of God" (Greek: Ἄνθρωπος τοῦ Θεοῦ).

Fleeing the resultant notoriety, he returned to Rome, so changed that his parents did not recognize him, but as good Christians took him in and sheltered him for seventeen years, which he spent in a dark cubbyhole beneath the stairs, praying and teaching catechism to children. After his death, his family found a note on his body which told them who he was and how he had lived his life of penance from the day of his wedding, for the love of God.

== French version ==
The life of St Alexius is recounted in a French poem, la Vie de saint Alexis, believed to date from the early or mid-11th century (although the earliest manuscript was written in the 12th century). This is regarded as one of the earliest works of French literature, and also one of the first poems in any romance language to be written in the 10 or 11-syllable iambic line which later became the iambic pentameter:

A un des porz ki plus est pres de Rome,
iloec arivet la nef a cel saint home.
"At one of the ports which is most near to Rome,
there arrived the ship of this holy man"

The poem consists of 125 five-line stanzas. The story follows the Greek version recounted above.

== Veneration ==
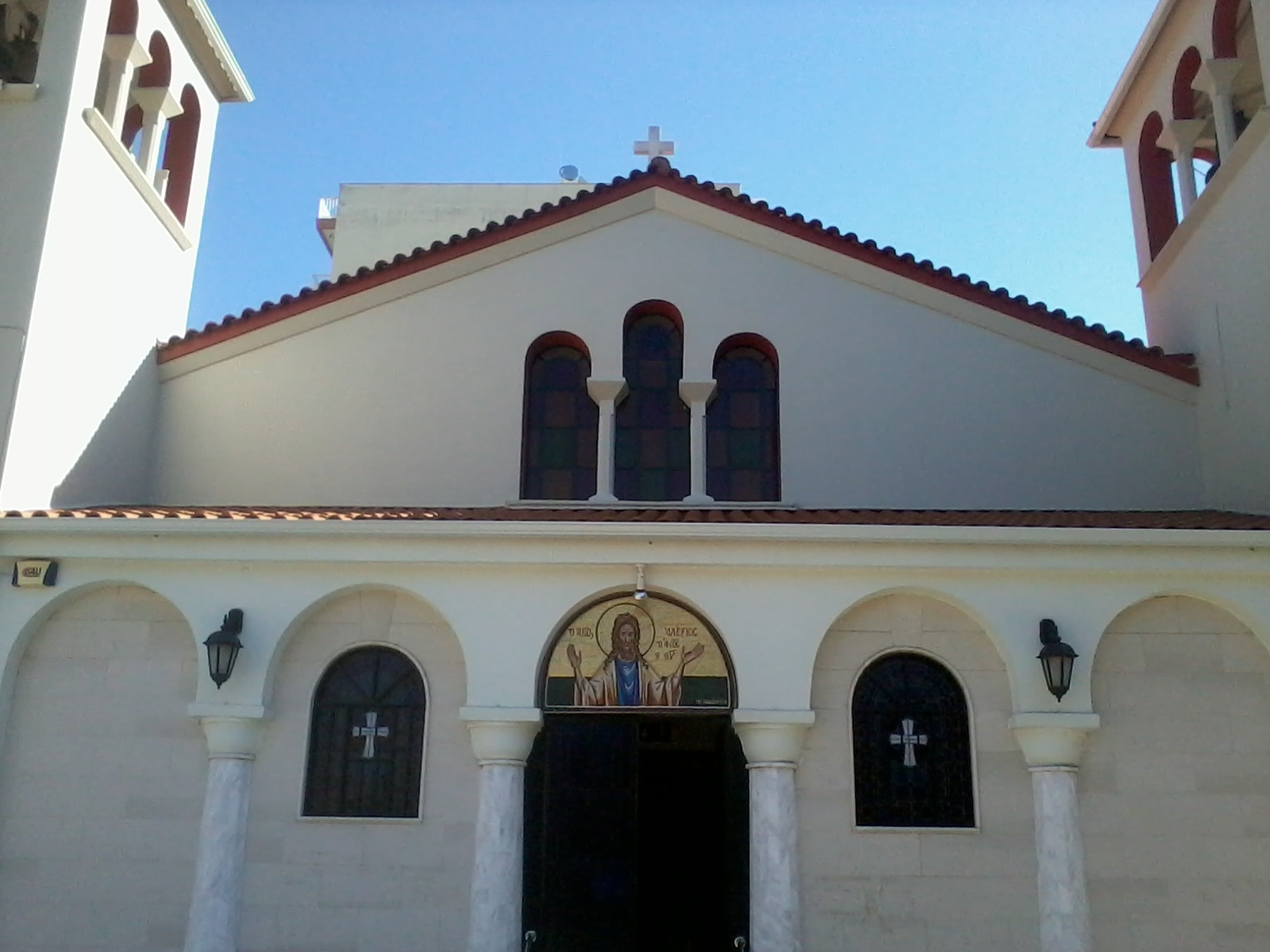
The church of Saint Alexios in Patras, Greece

Alexius seems to have been completely unknown in the West prior to the end of the tenth century. Only from the end of the 10th century did his name begin to appear in any liturgical books there.

Since before the 8th century, there was on the Aventine Hill in Rome a church that was dedicated to St Boniface. In 972, Pope Benedict VII transferred this almost abandoned church to the exiled Greek metropolitan, Sergius of Damascus. Sergius erected beside the church a monastery for Greek and Latin monks, soon made famous for the austere life of its inmates. St Alexius was added to the name of St Boniface as the titular saint of the church and monastery known as Santi Bonifacio e Alessio.

It was evidently Sergius and his monks who brought to Rome the veneration of Saint Alexius. The Eastern saint, according to his legend a native of Rome, was soon very popular with the people of Rome. This church, being associated with the legend, was considered to be built on the site of the home that Alexius returned to from Edessa.

St Alexius is mentioned in the Roman Martyrology under 17 July in the following terms: "At Rome, in a church on the Aventine Hill, a man of God is celebrated under the name of Alexius, who, as reported by tradition, abandoned his wealthy home, for the sake of becoming poor and to beg for alms unrecognized."

While the Catholic Church continues to recognize St Alexius as a saint, his feast was removed from the General Roman Calendar in 1969. The reason given was the legendary character of the written life of the saint. Johann Peter Kirsch remarked: "Perhaps the only basis for the story is the fact that a certain pious ascetic at Edessa lived the life of a beggar and was later venerated as a saint."

The Tridentine calendar gave his feast day the rank of "Simple" but, by 1862, it had become a "Semidouble" and, in Rome itself, a "Double". It was reduced again to the rank of "Simple" in 1955 and in 1960 became a "Commemoration". According to the rules in the present-day Roman Missal, the saint may now be celebrated everywhere on his feast day with a "Memorial", unless in some locality an obligatory celebration is assigned to that day.

The Eastern Orthodox Church venerates St Alexius on 17 March. Five Byzantine Emperors, four Emperors of Trebizond and numerous other eastern European and Russian personalities have borne his name (see Alexius). There are numerous churches bearing his name in Greece, Russia, and in other Orthodox countries. Saint Alexius is well known to the region of the north Peloponnese due to his skull being kept in the monastery of Agia Lavra.

Alexius is a patron saint of the Congregation of the Sacred Hearts of Jesus and Mary.

== Relics ==
Relics of Saint Alexius are found in some churches and monasteries in Greece, including the Esphigmenou monastery of Mount Athos and the Dormition of Theotokos Monastery, Boeotia. In Russia, relics of St Alexius are kept in the Alexander Nevsky Lavra in Saint Petersburg. In Cyprus, relics are kept in the Kykkos Monastery.

The most precious relic is a large part of the honorable skull of the Saint, which is kept in the monastery of Agia Lavra near Kalavrita, Greece. According to the Ktetorikon (monastic foundation codex) of the monastery, the honorable skull was donated to the monastery by the Byzantine emperor Manuel II Palaiologos in 1398 (this is also the inscription on the reliquary).

== References to St Alexius ==
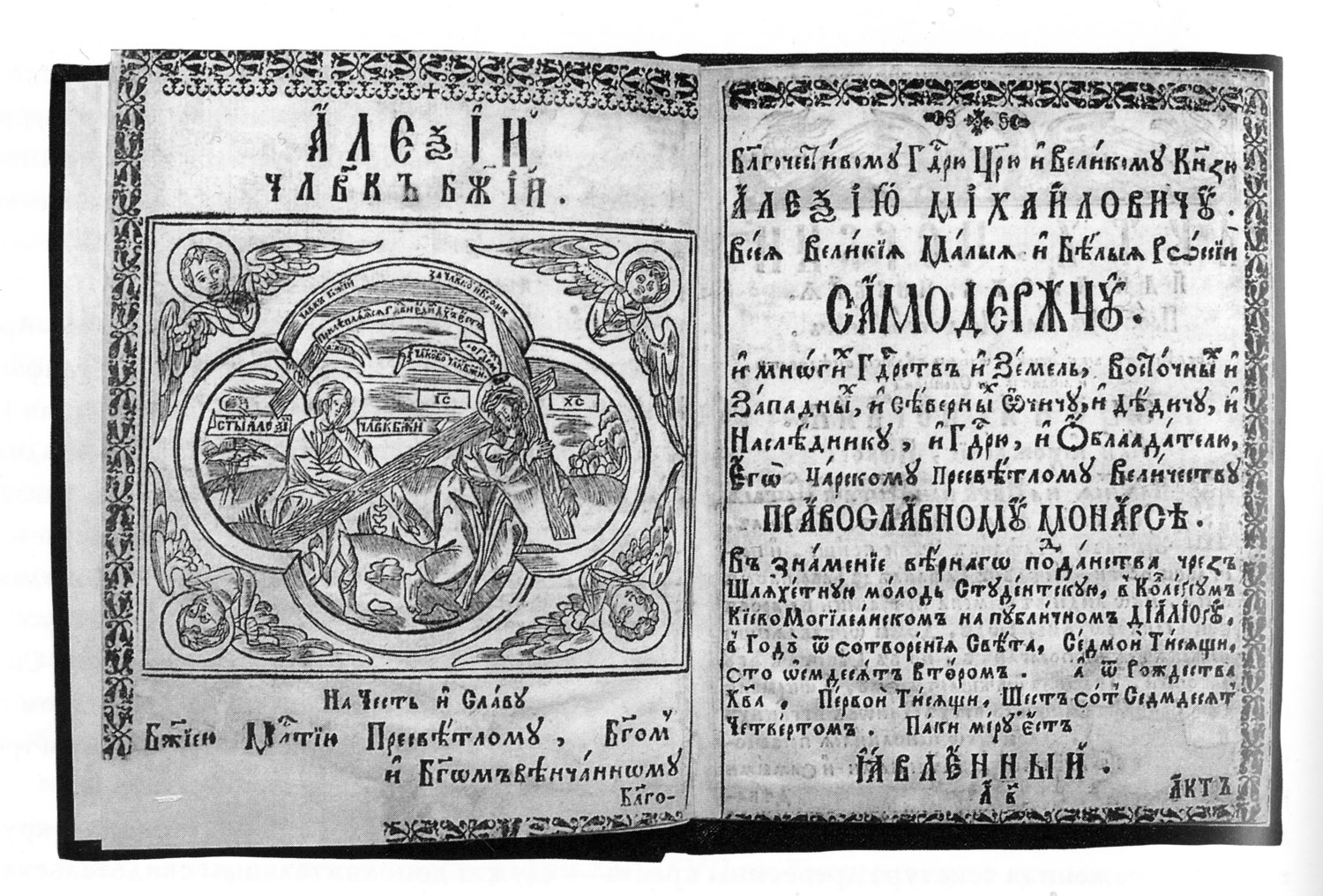
A 1674 theatre show program for the Saint Alexis the Man of God, presented in Kiev and dedicated to tsar Alexis of Russia

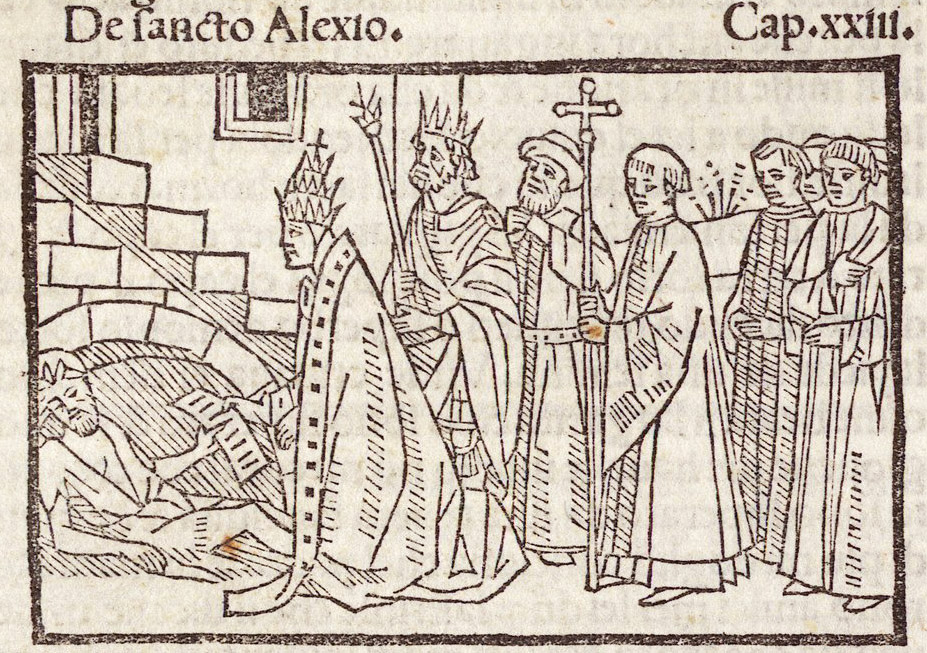
Alexius in the Golden Legend (1497)

- The Death of Saint Alexius, c.1638, by Pietro da Cortona
- Saint Alexis Parish and School, located in Wexford, Pennsylvania, is named for St Alexius.
- Stefano Landi wrote an opera about him (1632).
- Camilla de Rossi wrote an oratorio about him (1710).
- Rimsky-Korsakov wrote a secular cantata about him.
- Alexander Radishchev, in his Journey from St Petersburg to Moscow (1790), refers to the story of St Alexis as sung by a blind soldier begging in Klin, near Moscow.
- Mikhail Kuzmin wrote a play ("Komediia o Aleksee cheloveke bozhyem", "Comedy about Alexis, the Man of God") about the life of St. Alexis.
- In 1769, San Elijo Lagoon and beach in San Diego County, California were named San Alejo by the Portola Expedition for Saint Alexius. The spelling changed in later years to Elijo.
- Il Sant'Alessio, an opera in three acts composed by Stefano Landi in 1631 with a libretto by Giulio Rospigliosi
- St Alexius is also the patron saint of the religious institute known as the Alexians and of the Greek town of Kalavryta.
- The tale of St Alexius has parallels with that of The Prodigal Son, as told in the biblical Book of Luke. As it appears in Legenda aurea (later retold in the Gesta Romanorum).

== Gallery ==
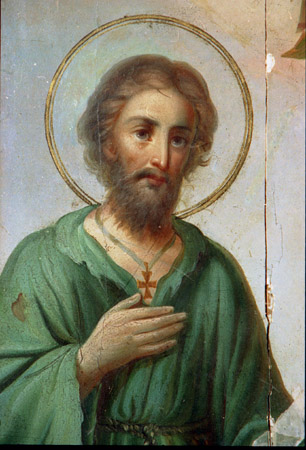
An Orthodox Icon of Alexius of Rome, Russia, XIX century.

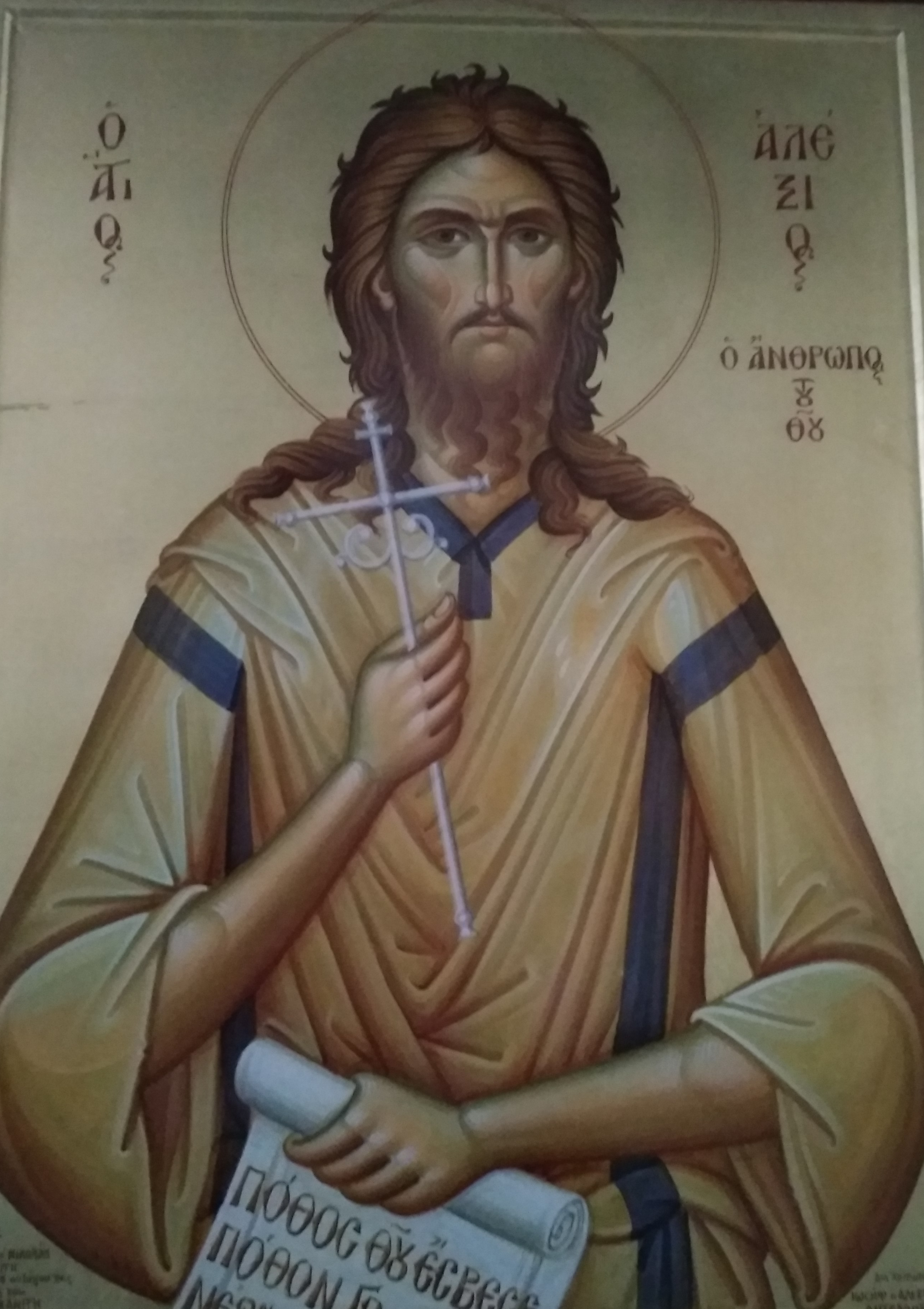
A Greek icon of Saint Alexius man of God (found in St Andrew's Cathedral, Patras)

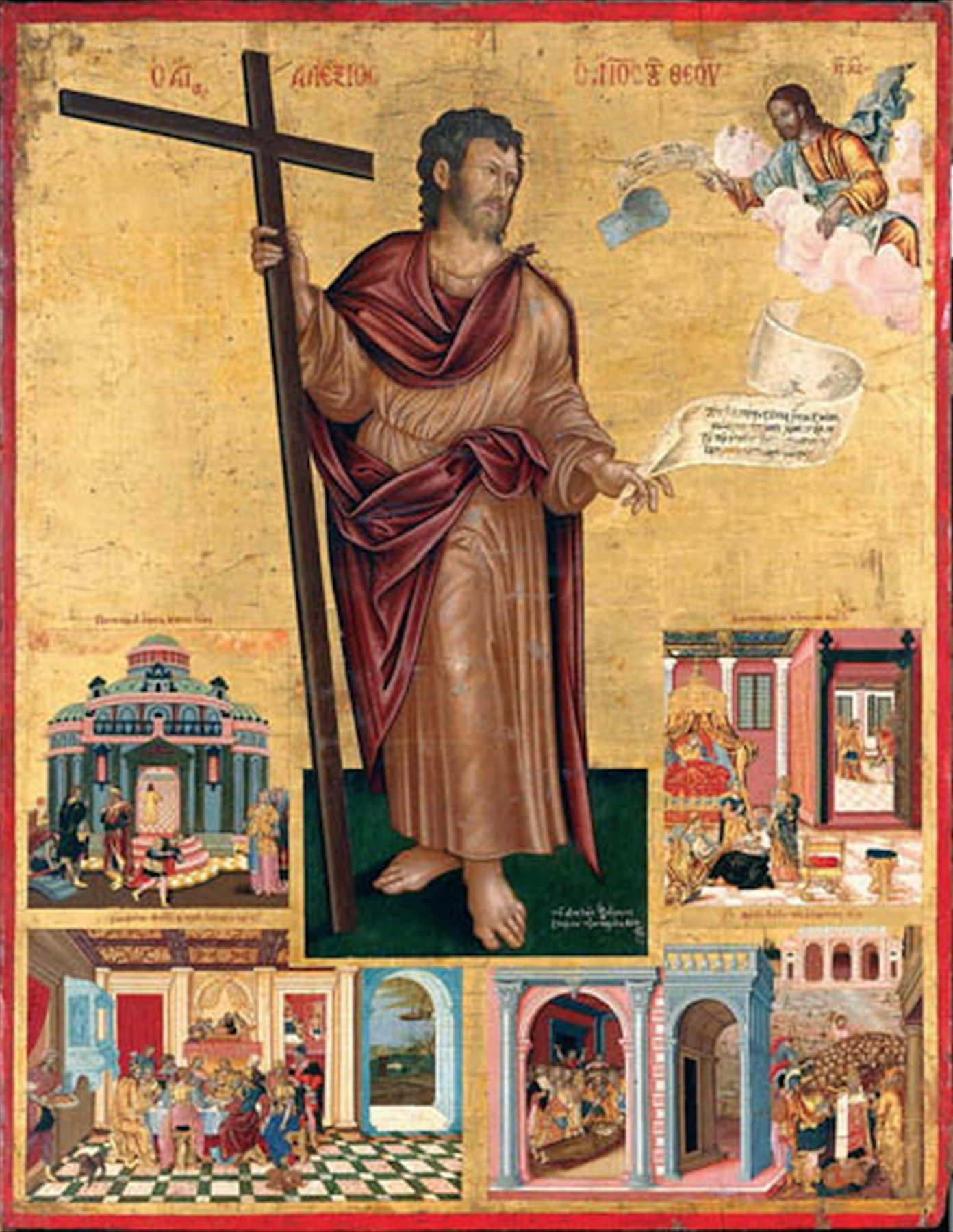
A Cretan icon by Stephanos Tzangarolas

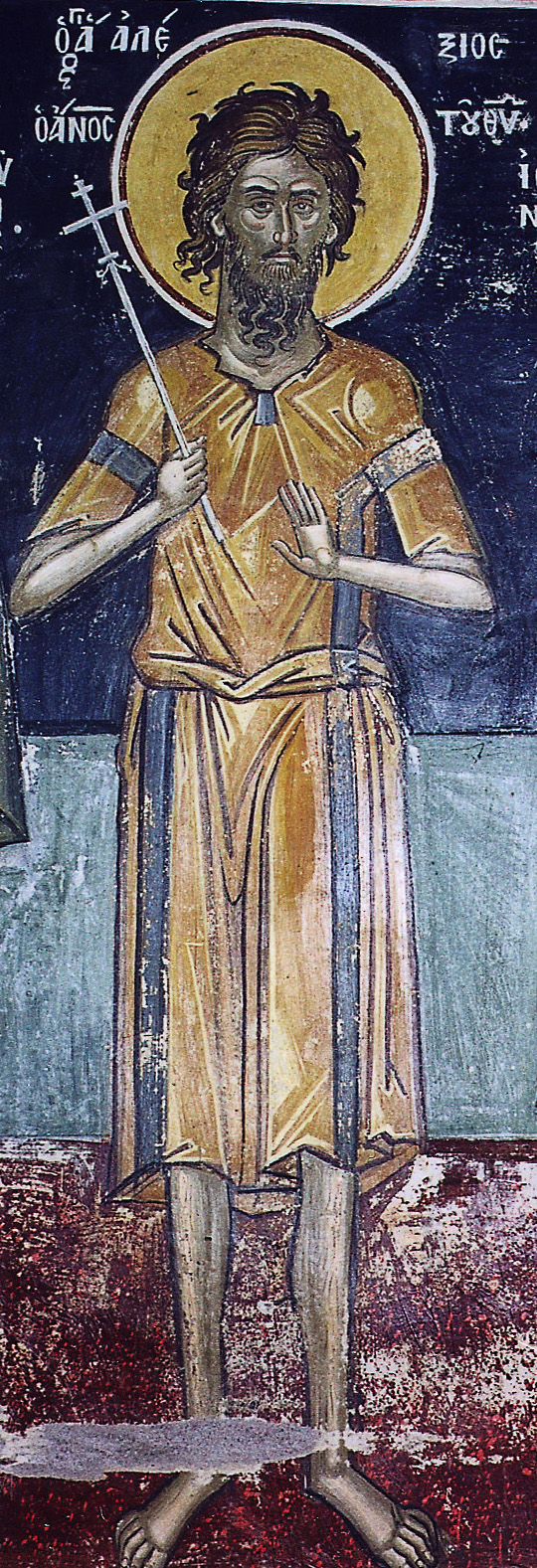
Fresco from the Dionysiou Monastery, 1547

== Bibliography ==
- Holweck, Frederick George (1924). A Biographical Dictionary of the Saints: With a General Introduction on Hagiology. Vol. 1. B. Herder Book Co.
- Judovitz, Dalia. Georges de La Tour and the Enigma of the Visible, New York, Fordham University Press, 2018. ISBN 0-82327-744-5; ISBN 9780823277445. p7, 11, 62-63,77, plate 18.
