= John VIII Palaiologos =

Byzantine emperor from 1425 to 1448

- Emperor and Autocrat of the Romans
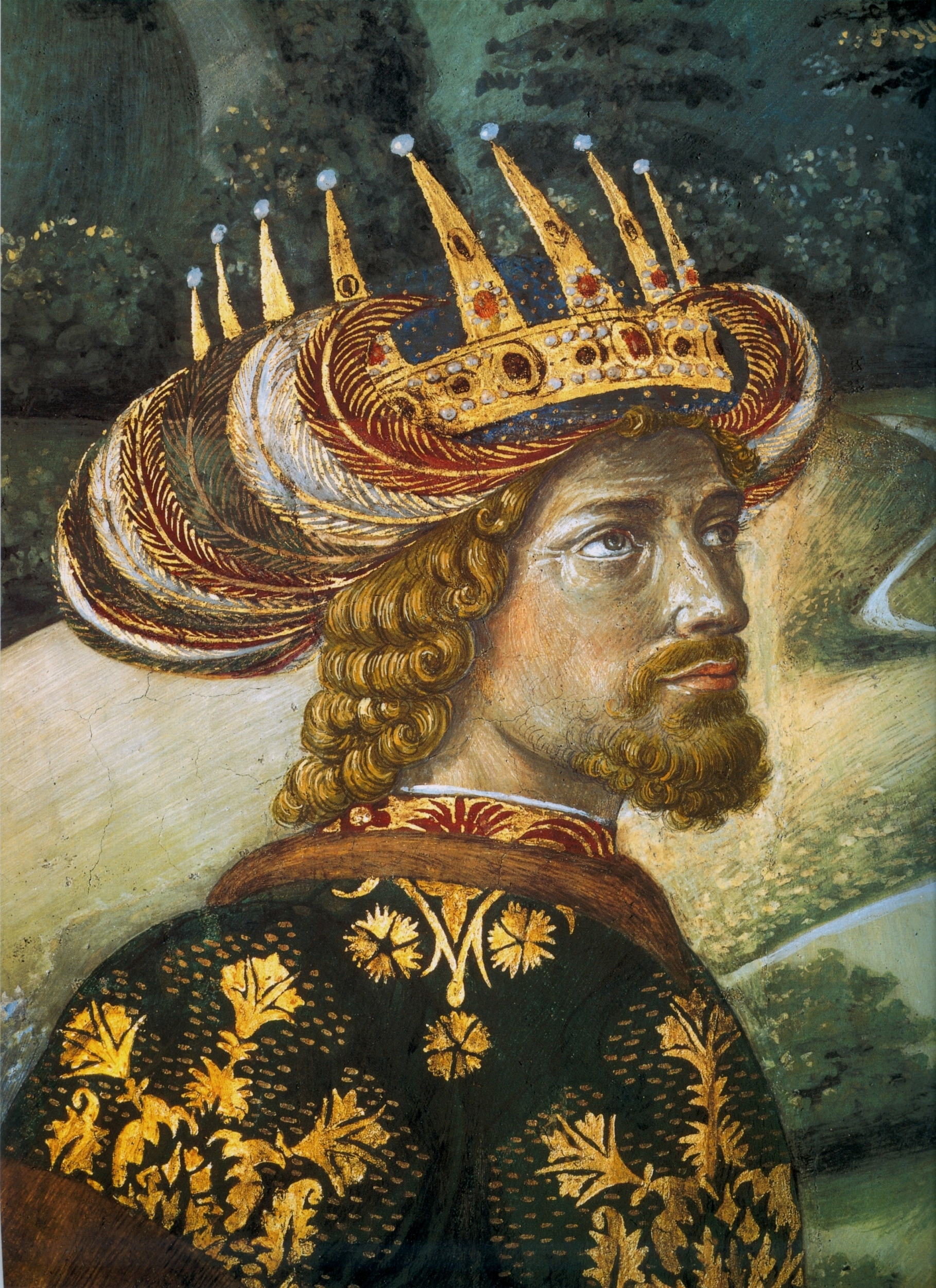
- Detail from The Middle King by Benozzo Gozzoli, in the Magi Chapel of Palazzo Medici-Riccardi, Florence, 1459–1461. Balthazar is represented as John VIII; the portrait is based on contemporary drawings made in Italy.

Eastern Roman emperor
- Reign: 21 July 1425 – 31 October 1448
- Coronation: 19 January 1421
- Predecessor: Manuel II Palaiologos
- Successor: Constantine XI Palaiologos
- Proclamation: c. 1407 as co-emperor
- Born: 18 December 1392
- Died: 31 October 1448 (aged 55)
- Spouse: Anna of Moscow (m. 1414; died 1417) Sophia of Montferrat (1421–1426) Maria of Trebizond (m. 1427; died 1439)
- Dynasty: Palaiologos
- Father: Manuel II Palaiologos
- Mother: Helena Dragaš
- Religion: Eastern Orthodoxy
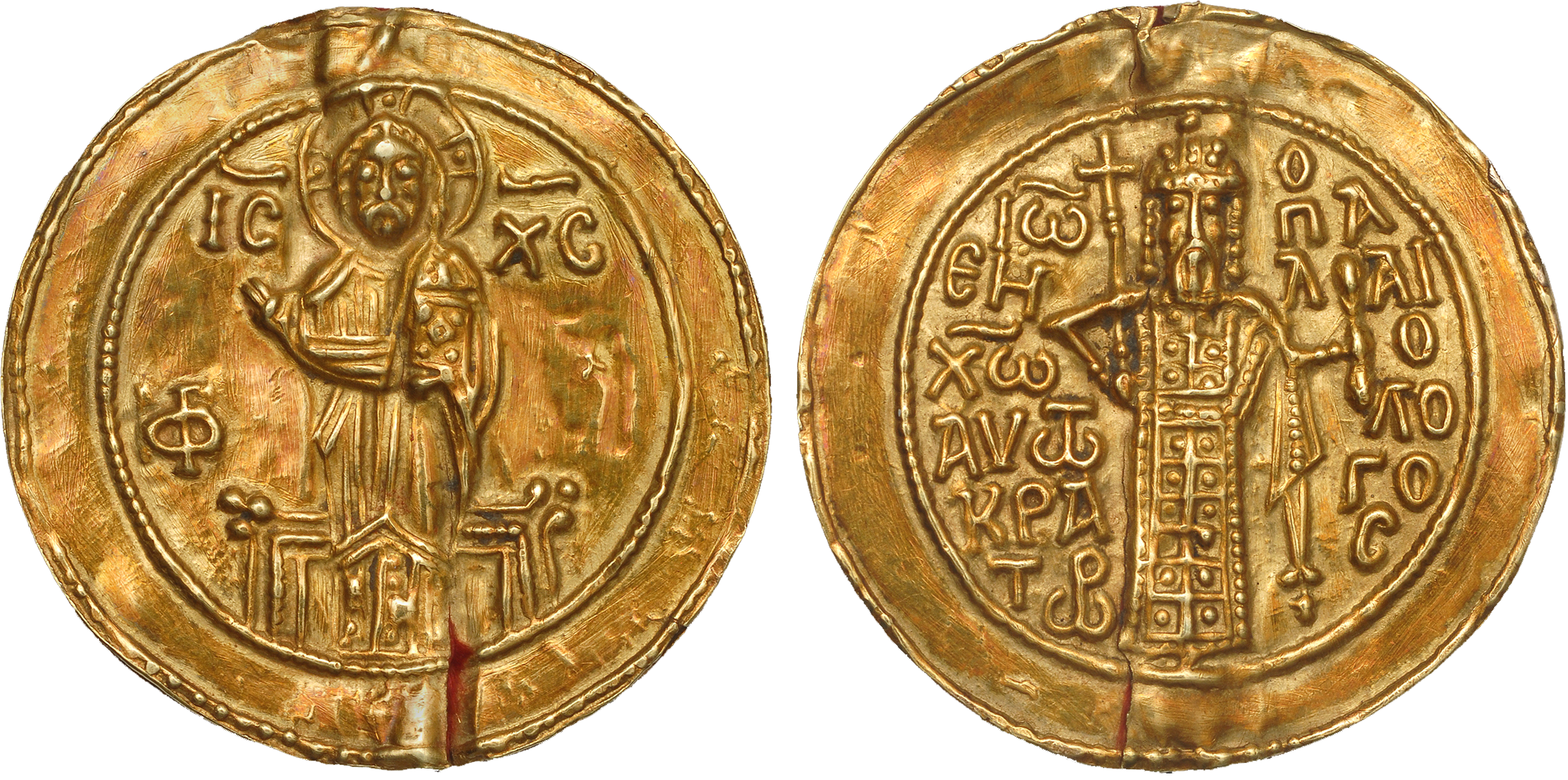
- Seal

John VIII Palaiologos (Greek: Ἰωάννης Παλαιολόγος, romanized: Iōánnēs Palaiológos; 18 December 1392 – 31 October 1448) was the penultimate Roman emperor to rule in Constantinople. Ruling from 1425 to 1448, he attempted to bring about the reunification of the Orthodox and Catholic churches and prioritised the protection of Constantinople against the Ottoman Empire. He was succeeded by his brother, Constantine XI, who would become the final emperor.

== Biography ==
John VIII was the eldest son of Manuel II Palaiologos and Helena Dragaš, the daughter of the Serbian prince Constantine Dragaš. He was associated as co-emperor with his father before 1416 and became sole emperor upon the death of his father on 21 July 1425, although he had already assumed full power on 19 January 1421.

In June 1422, John VIII Palaiologos supervised the defense of Constantinople during a siege by Murad II, but had to accept the loss of Thessalonica, which his brother Andronikos had given to Venice in 1423. To secure protection against the Ottomans, he made two journeys to Italy in 1423 and 1439. During the second journey he visited Pope Eugene IV in Ferrara and consented to the union of the Greek and Roman churches. The union was ratified at the Council of Florence in 1439, which John attended with 700 followers including Patriarch Joseph II of Constantinople and George Gemistos Plethon, a Neoplatonic philosopher influential among the academics of Italy. The union failed due to opposition in Constantinople, but through his prudent conduct towards the Ottoman Empire he succeeded in holding possession of the city.

John VIII Palaiologos named his brother Constantine XI, who had served as regent in Constantinople in 1437–1439, as his successor. Despite the machinations of his younger brother Demetrios Palaiologos his mother Helena was able to secure Constantine XI's succession in 1448.

John VIII died at Constantinople in 1448, becoming the last reigning Byzantine emperor to die of natural causes, and was buried in the Pantokrator Monastery.

== Marriages ==
John VIII Palaiologos was married three times. His first marriage was in 1414 to Anna of Moscow, daughter of Grand Prince Basil I of Moscow (1389–1425) and Sophia of Lithuania. She died in August 1417 of plague.

The second marriage, arranged by his father Manuel II and Pope Martin V, was to Sophia of Montferrat in 1421. She was a daughter of Theodore II, Marquess of Montferrat, and his second wife Joanna of Bar. Joanna was a daughter of Robert I, Duke of Bar, and Marie de Valois. Her maternal grandparents were John II of France and Bonne of Bohemia.

His third marriage, arranged by the future cardinal, Bessarion, was to Maria of Trebizond in 1427. She was a daughter of Alexios IV of Trebizond and Theodora Kantakouzene. She died in the winter of 1439, also from plague. None of the marriages produced any children.

== Representation in art ==
John VIII Palaiologos was famously depicted by several painters on the occasion of his visit to Italy. Perhaps the most famous of his portraits is the one by Benozzo Gozzoli, on the southern wall of the Magi Chapel, at the Palazzo Medici-Riccardi, in Florence. According to some interpretations, John VIII was also portrayed in Piero della Francesca's Flagellation. A portrait of John appears in a manuscript at the Saint Catherine's Monastery in the Sinai Peninsula.

=== Gallery ===
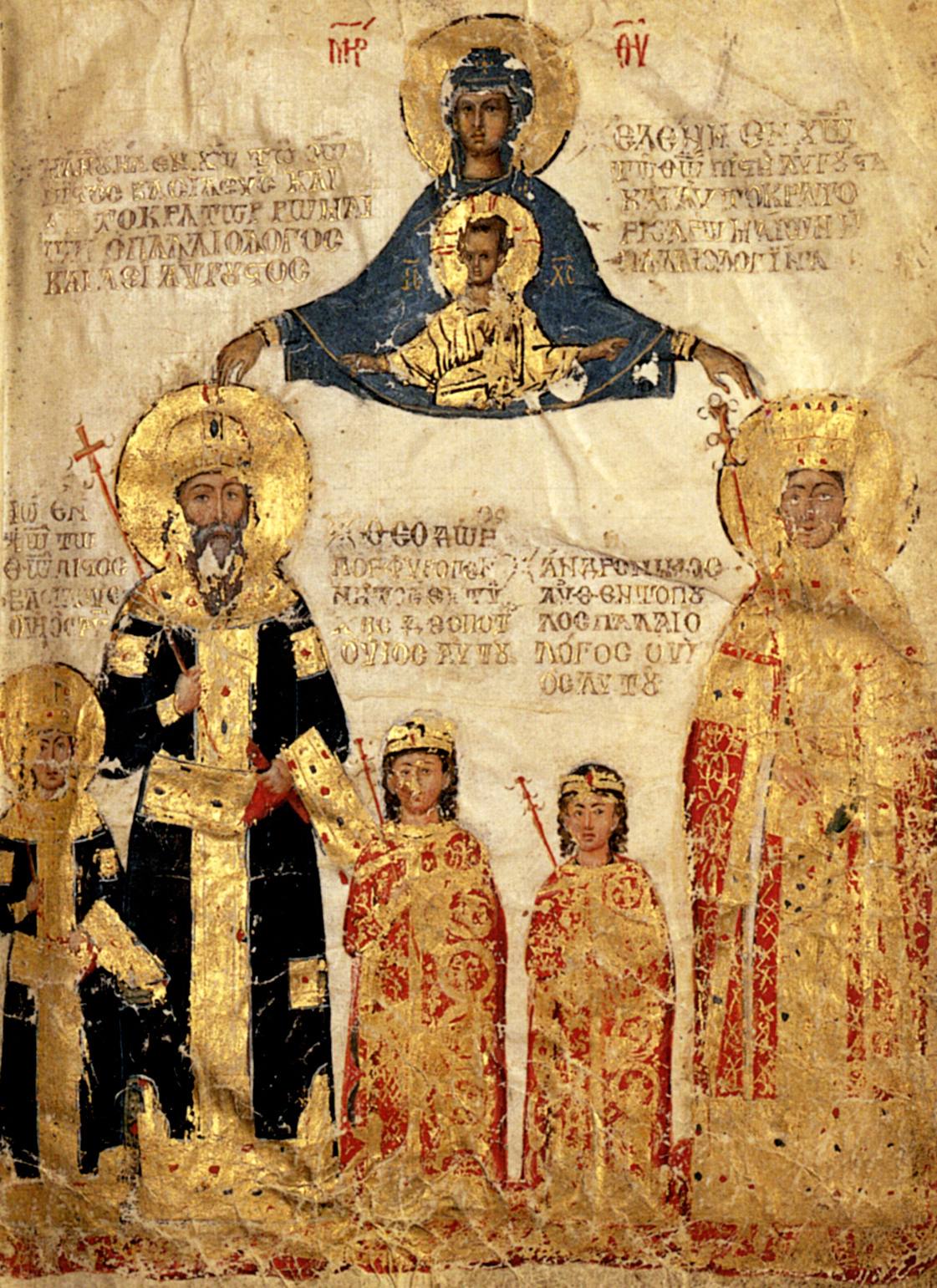
Miniature depicting a young John VIII (far left) with his family, c. 1404.

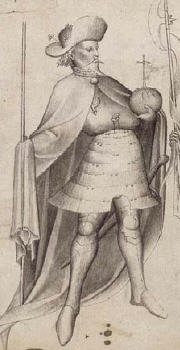
Anonymous drawing of John VIII during his visit in Buda, 1424

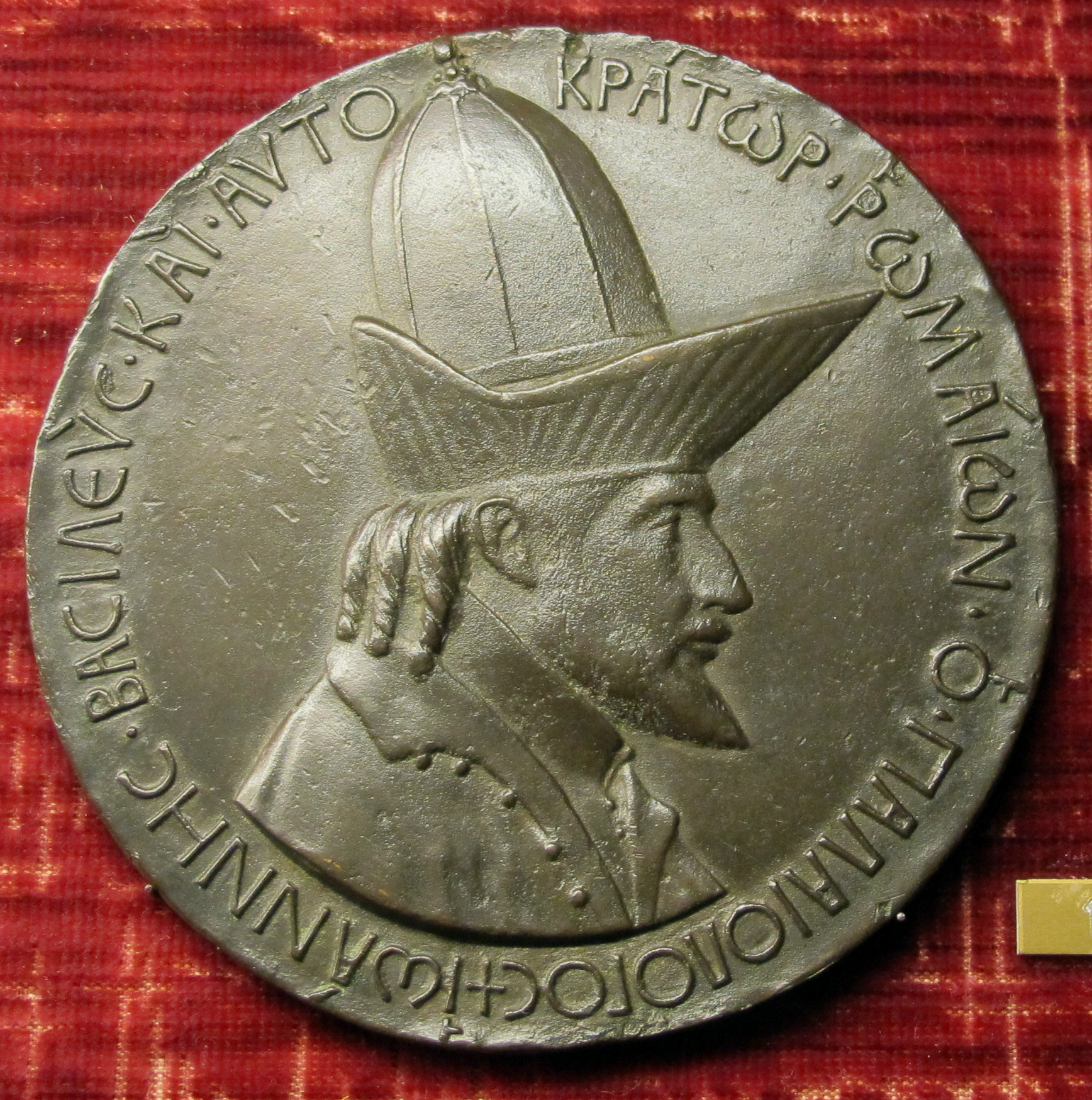
A famous portrait medal by Pisanello made in Florence, 1438

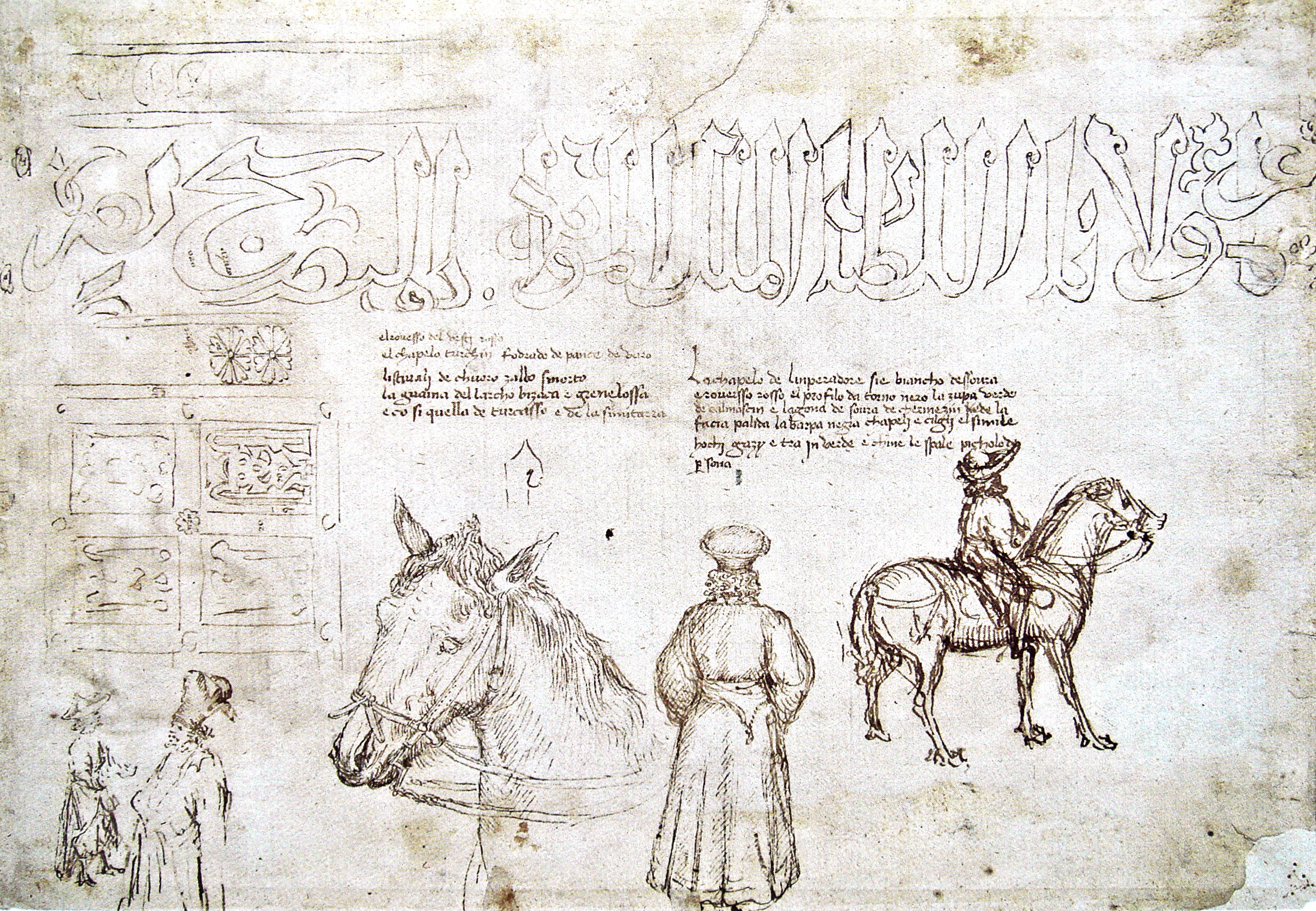
Sketches of John VIII at the Council of Florence, by Pisanello

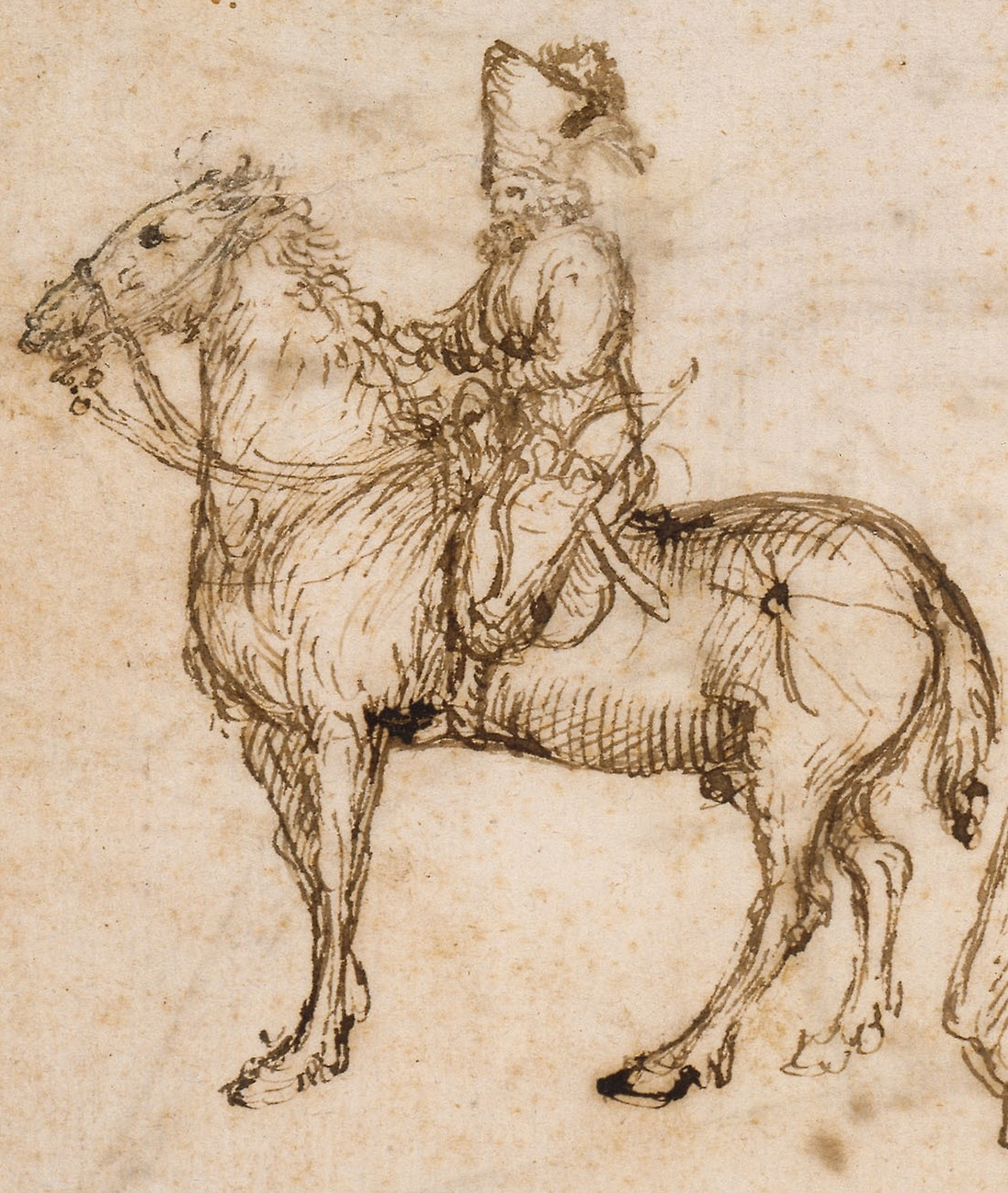
Another portrait by Pisanello, 1438.

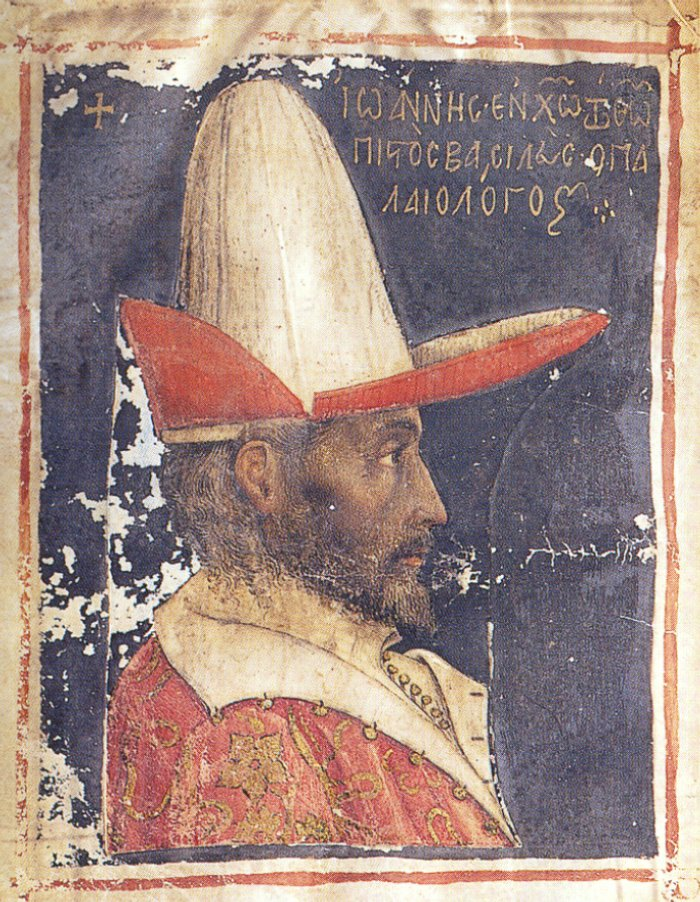
Portrait of John VIII from a manuscript at Saint Catherine's Monastery, Sinai, c. 1440.

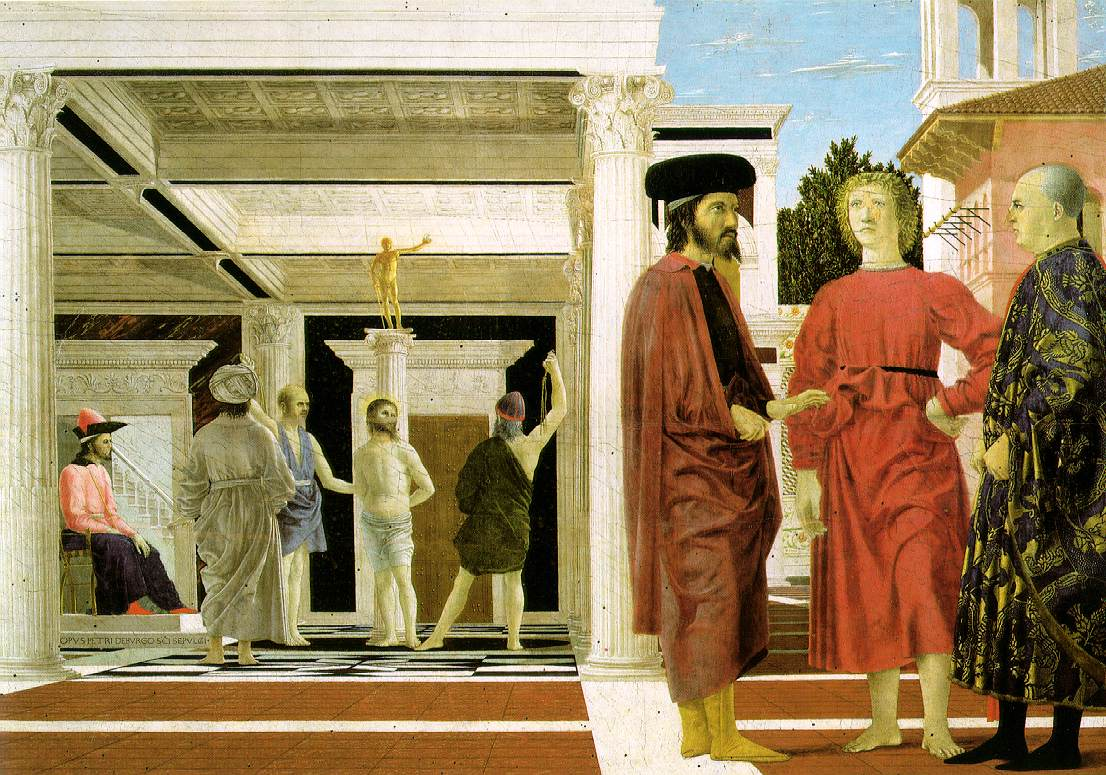
Piero della Francesca's Flagellation, possibly depicting John VIII as Pontius Pilatus (the leftmost figure)

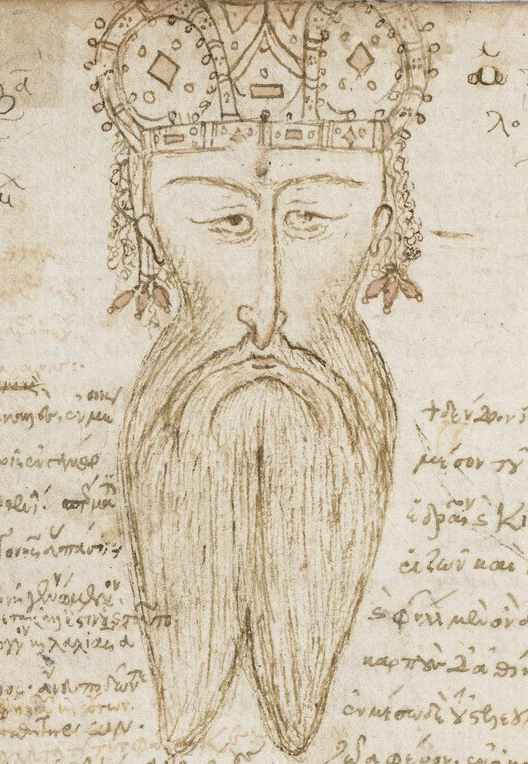
Anonymous portrait of an elder John VIII, likely made in Italy.

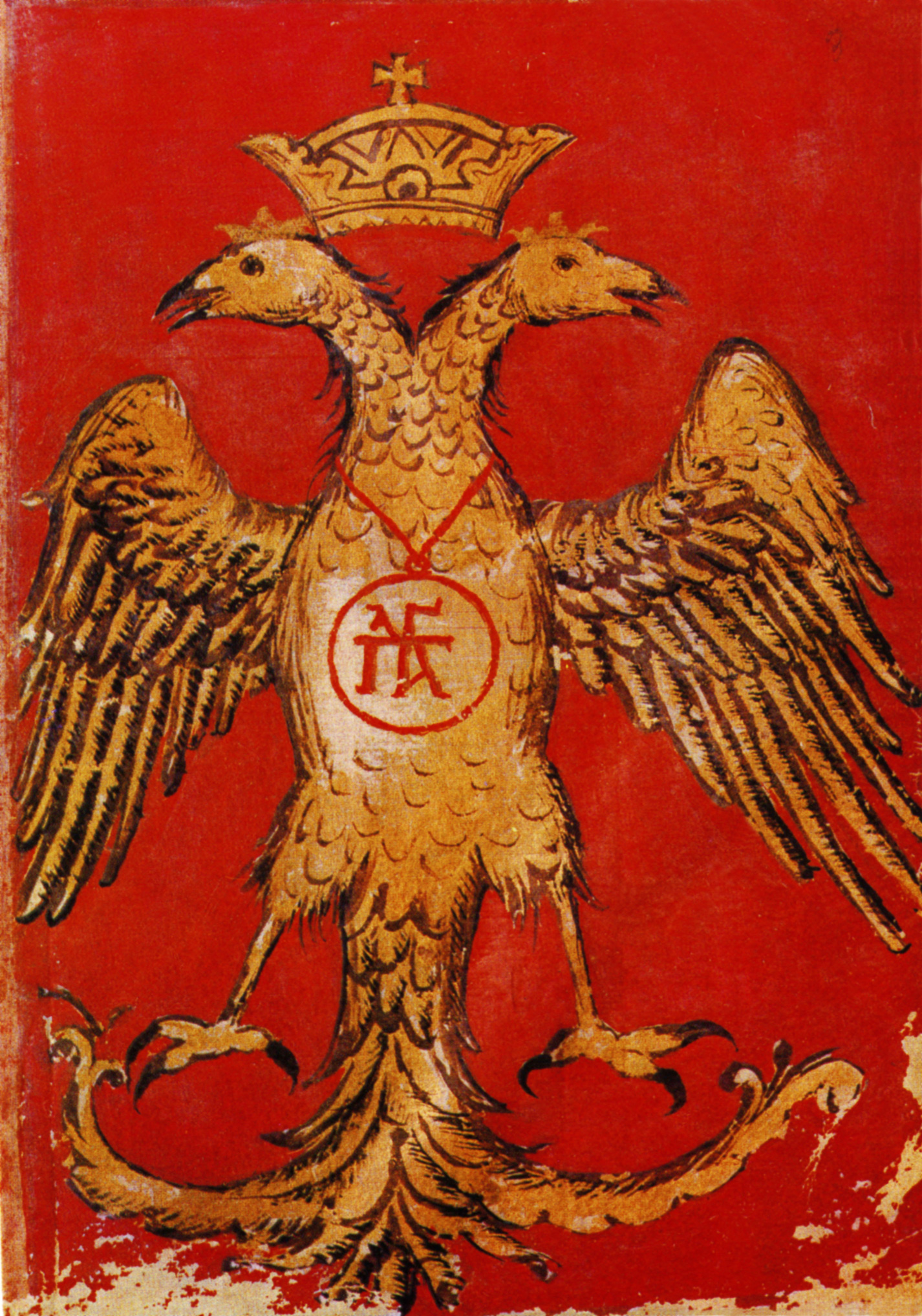
Device of John VIII featuring the double-headed eagle with the sympilema (family cypher) of the Palaiologoi

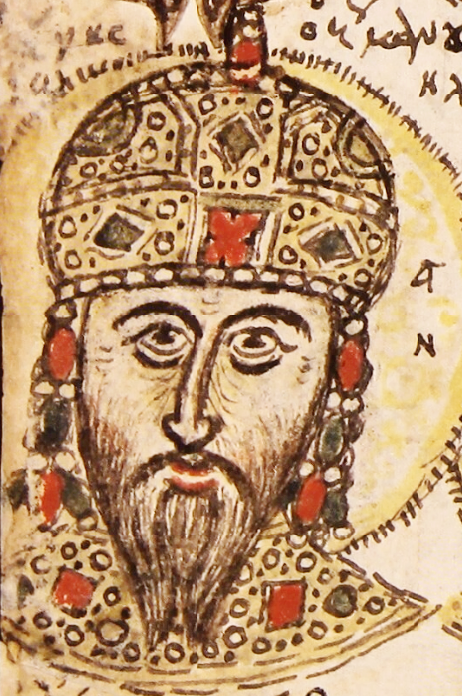
Portrait of John VIII from the Mutinensis gr. 122, completed shortly after the Fall of Constantinople

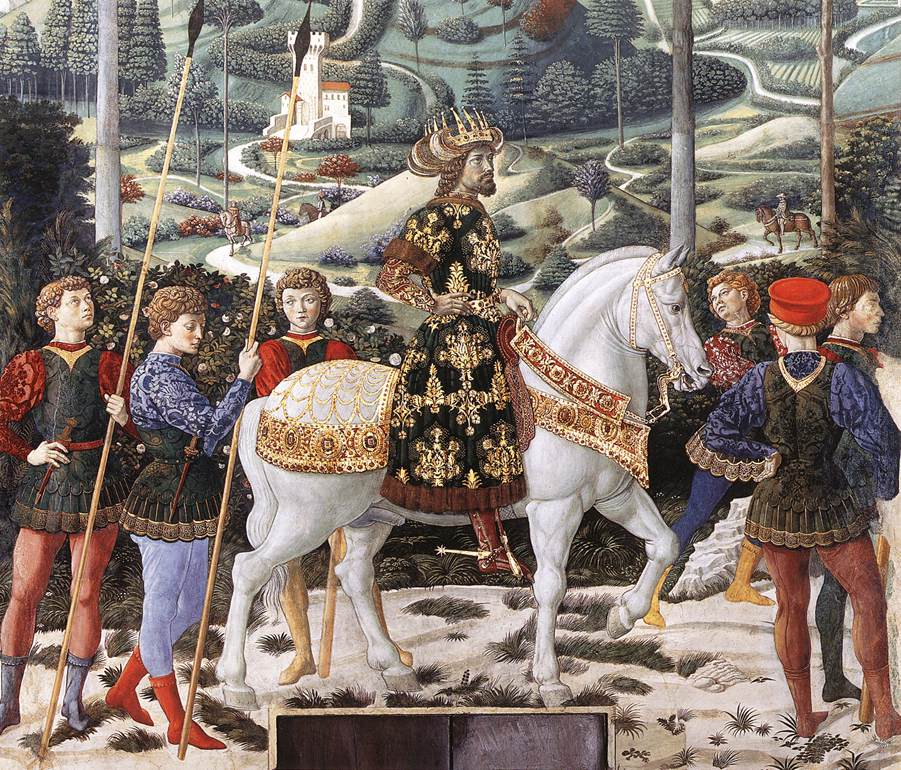
The Middle King by Benozzo Gozzoli, c. 1460.

== See also ==
- List of Byzantine emperors

== Sources ==
- Barker, John W. (1969). Manuel II Palaeologus (1391-1425): A Study in Late Byzantine Statesmanship. Rutgers University Press.
- Çelik, Siren (2021). Manuel II Palaiologos (1350–1425): A Byzantine Emperor in a Time of Tumult. Cambridge University Press.
- Chasin, Martin (1989). "The Crusade of Varna". In Hazard, Harry W.; Zacour, Norman P. (eds.). A History of the Crusades:The Impact of the Crusades on Europe. Vol. 6. University of Wisconsin Press.
- Nicol, Donald M. (1992). The Immortal Emperor: The Life and Legend of Constantine Palaiologos, Last Emperor of the Romans. Cambridge University Press.
- Runciman, Steven (1965). The Fall of Constantinople, 1453. Cambridge University Press.

John VIII Palaiologos Palaiologos dynasty Born: 18 December 1392 Died: 31 October 1448
Regnal titles
Preceded by Manuel II Palaiologos	Byzantine Emperor; 1425–1448	Succeeded by Constantine XI Palaiologos Dragases
