= Alexia Kelley =

Alexia Kelley is the president and CEO of FADICA (Foundations and Donors Interested in Catholic Activities). Prior to that appointment, she was deputy director and senior advisor in the White House Office of Faith-based and Neighborhood Partnerships, as well as former director of the Department of Health and Human Services' Center for Faith-Based and Neighborhood Partnerships. She was the principal founder and executive director of Catholics in Alliance for the Common Good.

== Education and career ==
Kelley graduated with a B.A. in Religion with honors from Haverford College in 1989. Her thesis focused on the writings and speeches of the Quaker abolitionist and suffragist Lucretia Mott. After college, she worked at the Friends Committee on National Legislation (FCNL) in Washington, D.C., a Quaker social justice lobby and one of the oldest ecumenical lobby organizations in the United States. From there, she attended Harvard Divinity School, graduating in 1993 with a Master of Theological Studies.

Following graduate school, Kelley worked for the Catholic Campaign for Human Development, a national Catholic anti-poverty initiative, for nearly a decade. During her tenure at CCHD, Kelley co-edited Living the Catholic Social Tradition: Cases and Commentary with Dr. Kathleen Maas Weigert. The book profiles community organizing projects across the country that had received support from CCHD, and it explores the principles of the Catholic social tradition that undergird support and participation in such projects.

Following her tenure at CCHD, Kelley worked for three years at Environmental Resources Trust (ERT), a business unit of the non-profit organization Winrock International dedicated to promoting renewable energy development and climate change mitigation. There she worked on renewable energy policy and development projects, including a partnership between ERT and Verdant Power.

In the fall of 2004, she took a leave from ERT from to serve as religious outreach director for the Democratic National Committee on the John Kerry campaign. She assisted in outreach to faith communities for the Kerry campaign. In 2005, she co-founded Catholics in Alliance for the Common Good, a faith-based organization that works to promote the Catholic social justice tradition and Catholic support for social justice issues such as health care reform, economic justice, peace, and labor rights.

Kelley co-authored A Nation for All: How the Catholic Vision of the Common Good Can Save America from the Politics of Division with Catholics United director Chris Korzen. The book, published in July 2008, reintroduced the concept of the common good into the national dialogue on faith and politics, as both a uniquely Catholic and American principle.
