= Alexius of Nicaea =

Bishop of Nicaea

Alexius (Greek: Ἀλέξιος) was a metropolitan bishop of Nicaea who composed a Canon or Hymn about Saint Demetrius of Thessaloniki. It is uncertain when he lived. The canon is in manuscript.
