= Alessia Amenta =

Archaeologist and curator of Egyptian antiquities at Vatican Museums

- Occupations: Egyptologist and archeologist
- Known for: founder of the Vatican Mummy Project

Alessia Amenta is an Egyptologist and archeologist and curator at the Department of Egyptian Antiquities of the Vatican Museums.

== Ny-Maat-Re ==
In 2006, Amenta had directed the study and restoration of Ny-Maat-Re, a mummy that was donated to Pope Leo XIII by the Khedive of Egypt in 1894. Her direction was a collaboration between the paleoanthropologists Barbara Lippi and Francesco Mallegni of the Department of Biology, University of Pisa and entomologist Massimo Masetti from the Department of Bioimaging and Radiological Sciences of the Roman Catholic University of the Sacred Heart. The mummy was first unearthed in Faiyum, Egypt, and was dated from between 270 and 210 BC. The mummy was restored by 2008 with the help from Cinzia Oliva, a Textile Restorer with the collaboration of the Textile Conservation Laboratory of the Vatican Museums, and was studied for cause of death, nutrition, age and possible pathologies thanks also to the collaboration of the EURAC Institute for Mummies in Bolzano, Italy.

The results of the investigation discovered that the mummy, initially identified as a woman, was actually a man. He had come "from the Fayoum Region, had lived sometime between 270 and 210 BC, had died at 25/30 years old, and had suffered from Schmorl hernia."

== Vatican Mummy project ==
As a founder of the Vatican Mummy project in 2007, Amenta led a multidisciplinary team of researchers to study climate control in the museum for the preservation of the mummies. The Vatican Museum collection houses nine full mummified bodies and 18 body parts, which require special climate control to slow down the specimen decay and protect any DNA that might remain there. Ancient DNA could help researchers uncover the genetic evolution of today's diseases.

In the process, Amenta's group discovered two fake mini mummies dating possibly to the 19th century. One contained the shinbone of a man that was wrapped in ancient bandages and decorated to resemble a small Egyptian mummy. The researchers found that the fake mummies were crafted in England or Wales in the Middle Ages.

== Other activities ==
Amenta has participated in many archaeological excavations in Italy and at Western Thebes in Egypt. She is also director of the Vatican Coffin Project, leading an international research team in the study of Egyptian polychrome coffins.

== Selected works ==
Amenta has published books as well as many journal papers.

- Amenta, A. (2002). Project for a Corpus of the Patechi of the Egyptian Collections in Italy and relative study of the figure of the "Great Dwarf" in the Egyptian magic texts. Project for a Corpus of the Patechi of the Egyptian Collections in Italy and related study of the figure of the "Great Dwarf" in the Egyptian magical texts, 1000–1012.
- Amenta, A., Sordi, M. N., & Luiselli, M. M. (2005). Water in ancient Egypt: life, regeneration, spell, medicine: proceedings of the first International conference for young egyptologists: Italy, Chianciano Terme, October 15–18, 2003. Water in ancient Egypt, 1–444.
- Amenta, A. (2005).The Water In Ancient Egypt: Life, Regeneration, Spell, Medicine (L'Erma Di Bretschneider)
- Amenta, A. (2006). The Amarna parenthesis: the monotheistic revolution of Pharaoh Akhenaten. The Amarna parenthesis, 1000–1023.
- Amenta, A. (2006). The pharaoh in the cosmic dimension: the temple. The pharaoh in the cosmic dimension, 1000–1024.
- Amenta, A. (2008).The Treasures of Tutankhamun and the Egyptian Museum of Cairo (White Star Editions)
- Amenta, A. (2012). The Vatican's contribution to the Sonqi Tino excavation. The Vatican's contribution to the excavation of Sonqi Tino, 539–552.
- Pelo, S., Correra, P., Danza, F. M., Amenta, A., Gasparini, G., Marianetti, T. M., & Moro, A. (2012). Evaluation of the dentoskeletal characteristics of an Egyptian mummy with three-dimensional computer analysis. Journal of Craniofacial Surgery, 23(4), 1159–1162.
