= Lex (surname) =

Lex is a surname. Notable people with the surname include:

- Alfred Lex (1913-1944), German Waffen-SS officer in World War II
- Hans Ritter von Lex (1893-1970), German politician and civil servant, and President of the German Red Cross
- Konrad Lex (born 1974), German ski mountaineer
- Stefan Lex (born 1989), German former professional footballer
- Sten Lex (born 1982), and Lex (born 1982), known as Sten & Lex, two Italian street artists

== See also ==
- Alice Lex-Nerlinger (1893–1975), German artist in painting, photography, photomontage and photograms
- Laura Lexx (born 1986), British comedian
