= Alexia Coley =

Alexia Coley is a West London-based soul singer-songwriter recording on the Jalapeno Records label. She is the daughter of Ethel Coley and previously fronted The Rotten Hill Gang big band.

Her debut single "Keep the Faith" received national airplay from Craig Charles on his funk and soul show on BBC Radio 6 Music Music as well as plays on BBC London and BBC Radio 2. It was also positively reviewed in issue 1070 of Blues & Soul magazine, receiving 8 out of 10 stars in a review. She was interviewed and featured on Craig Charles' show on 28 May 2013, to talk about her EP and debut album.

Coley's debut album Keep the Faith was released in October 2014 on Jalapeno Records. It featured the singles "Keep the Faith", "Beautiful Waste Of Time" and "Drive Me Wild".
