= D'Alessio =

D'Alessio is an Italian surname. Notable people with the surname include:

- Andrés J. d'Alessio (1940–2009), Argentine academic
- Carlos d'Alessio (1935–1992), French composer
- Charlotte D'Alessio (born 1998), Canadian model
- Corrie D'Alessio (born 1969), Canadian ice hockey player
- Ernesto D'Alessio (born 1977), Mexican actor
- Gigi D'Alessio (born 1967), Italian pop singer and songwriter
- Jillian D'Alessio (born 1985), Canadian kayaker
- Lupita D'Alessio (born 1954), Mexican singer and actress
- Ugo D'Alessio (1909–1979), Italian film actor

D'Alesio

- Donald D'Alesio, American football coach
