= Alexia Mupende =

Rwandan model, actress and fitness expert (born 1984)

- Born: 17 November 1984; Nairobi, Kenya
- Died: 8 January 2019 (aged 34); Kigali, Rwanda
- Citizenship: Rwanda
- Education: Namasagali College (O-Level Certificate); St. Lawrence College Uganda (High School Diploma); University of Rwanda (Bachelor of Information Technology)
- Occupations: Model, Actress, Beauty Consultant, Fitness Expert
- Title: Former General Manager at Waka Fitness, in Kigali, Rwanda

Alexia Uwera Mupende (17 November 1984 – 8 January 2019) was a Rwandan model, actress and fitness expert, who at the time of her death, was the general manager at Waka Fitness, in Kigali, the capital city of Rwanda.

== Early life and education ==
Alexia Uwera was born in Kenya. She attended school in Uganda, obtaining her O-Level certificate from Namasagali College in Kamuli District. She went on to obtain her High School Diploma from St. Lawrence College, in the Central Region of Uganda. After that she transferred to Rwanda where she graduated with a Bachelor of Information Technology from the University of Rwanda.

== Career ==
Alexia Mupende was an international model, who had represented her country, Rwanda, at fashion events in Kampala, Uganda, Geneva, Switzerland, Dubai, United Arab Emirates, Colombo, Sri Lanka and Mumbai, India. To supplement her modelling income, she served as the general manager of Waka Fitness, a fitness club in the city of Kigali.

== Death ==
On the evening of Tuesday, 8 January 2019, the body of Alexia Uwera Mupende was found in one of the bedrooms at her father's home in Nyarugunga Sector, Kicukiro District, a suburb of the city of Kigali. She had been stabbed multiple times.

Rwandan security officials announced that they were looking for Antoine Niyireba, aged 23 years, who was a domestic worker at the deceased's parent's home. He was the prime suspect in the murder.

== Other considerations ==
At the time of her death, she was engaged to be married in February 2019, and the invitations for the wedding had been released.

== See also ==
- Cynthia Munwangari
