= Alexios V of Trebizond =

Alexios V Megas Komnenos
- Emperor and Autocrat of all the East and Perateia
- Alexios V Megas Komnenos, as depicted in a modern religious icon

Trapezuntine emperor
- Reign: April 1460
- Predecessor: John IV Megas Komnenos
- Successor: David II Megas Komnenos
- Born: 1454; Trebizond (modern-day Trabzon, Turkey)
- Died: 1 November 1463 (aged c. 9); Constantinople (modern-day Istanbul, Turkey)
- Dynasty: Komnenos
- Father: Alexander Megas Komnenos
- Mother: Maria Gattilusio

Alexios V Megas Komnenos (Greek: Ἀλέξιος Σκαντάριος Μέγας Κομνηνός, romanized: Alexios Skantarios Megas Komnēnos; (Note: Alexios V is variously recorded as Alexios Skantarios Komnenos or Alexios Megas Komnenos. Skantarios is a name seemingly of Turkish origin sometimes attributed to Alexios' father Alexander, possibly derived from the Turkish version of Alexander (İskender).) 1454 – 1 November 1463) was very briefly Trapezuntine emperor in April 1460, succeeding his uncle John IV, until his deposition by his other uncle, David. Alexios was the son and only known child of Alexander, a brother of John IV and David. Alexander served as co-emperor with John IV but died prior to 1460, which left the young Alexios as John IV's heir. Almost immediately after Alexios's accession, David, with support of the influential Kabazites family, deposed Alexios and took the throne for himself.

Alexios was executed alongside the rest of his family by the Ottomans at Constantinople in 1463, two years after Trebizond's fall to the Ottoman Empire, after David was accused of plotting treason against the Ottoman sultan Mehmed II.

== Life ==
Alexios V Megas Komnenos was born in 1454 as the only known child of Alexander Megas Komnenos, (Note: Alexios was previously erroneously believed to have been the son of Alexander's brother, John IV Megas Komnenos, but contemporary documents demonstrate that he was Alexander's son.) a Trapezuntine co-emperor, and Maria Gattilusio, a daughter of Dorino I Gattilusio, the lord of the island of Lesbos. Alexander, who is also called Skantarios in some sources, was a son of the Trapezuntine emperor Alexios IV Megas Komnenos (r. 1417–1429) and had been his designated heir. Alexios IV was however assassinated and succeeded by Alexander's elder brother, John IV Megas Komnenos (r. 1429–1460), in 1429. Initially hostile to each other, the two brothers eventually reconciled and Alexander appears to have been named co-emperor by his brother in the 1450s, as John IV lacked sons of his own and preferred Alexander over their other brother, David. Alexander predeceased John, which left the young Alexios to be designated as John's heir.

Alexios was very briefly emperor after his uncle's death, in April 1460, but he was almost immediately deposed by his uncle, David, who thereafter took the throne for himself. David was both an adult and an experienced commander and must as such have viewed himself as a more suitable candidate. David's usurpation, mainly supported by the aristocratic Kabazites family, was so swift that some contemporary and near-contemporary sources describe David as immediately succeeding John IV. However, the contemporary historian Laonikos Chalkokondyles writes that David took the throne from his young nephew.

Alexios' life from his deposition to his death is poorly known. Conflicting accounts describe him as living in exile in Pera, in the vicinity of Constantinople, or remaining in Trebizond. Later sources state that the Ottoman sultan Mehmed II, who had conquered Constantinople in 1453, at some point took the young Alexios as one of his pages. On 15 August 1461, Mehmed II conquered Trebizond, and allowed Alexios's uncle David and his family to settle near Adrianople, but in 1463, the sultan accused them of plotting treachery. Perhaps these accusations derived from Trebizond at this time having been temporarily captured by Uzun Hasan of the Aq Qoyunlu, David's brother-in-law. At this time, Alexios lived alongside David and his sons. Alexios briefly converted to Islam following the treason charges but re-converted to Christianity shortly thereafter. He was executed alongside David and David's children at Constantinople on 1 November 1463. In July 2013, Alexios, David and David's executed sons were canonized as saints by the Eastern Orthodox Church.

== Notes ==
Alexios V of Trebizond Komnenos dynasty Born: 1454 Died: 1 November 1463
Regnal titles
Preceded by John IV	Trapezuntine emperor 1460	Succeeded by David II
