= Alexias =

4th-century BC Greek physician

Alexias (Greek: Ἀλεξίας) was an ancient Greek physician who was a pupil of Thrasyas of Mantinea, and lived probably around the middle of the 4th century BC. Theophrastus mentions him as having lived shortly before his time, and speaks highly of his abilities and acquirements. He was said to have equalled his master Thrasyas in the science of botany, and to have exceeded him in other areas.
