= Cordyle =

Town in ancient Pontus

Coordinates: 41°04′54″N 39°29′48″E

Cordyle or Kordyle (Ancient Greek: Κορδύλη), also called Portus Chordyle, was a town of ancient Pontus, on the Black Sea coast, 40 or 45 stadia east of Hieron Oros or Yoros. The name occurs in the Tabula Peutingeriana in the form Cordile. There appears to be some confusion in Ptolemy about this place.

Its site is located near Akcakale in Trabzon Province at Turkey.
