= Alexios IV of Trebizond =

Alexios IV Megas Komnenos
- Emperor and Autocrat of all the East and Perateia
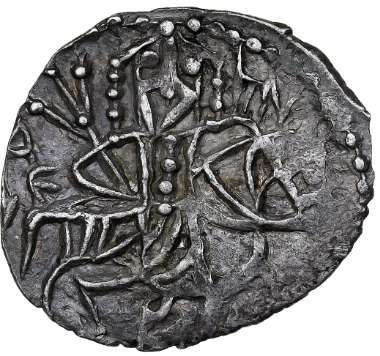
- Coin of Alexios IV, depicting him on horseback

Emperor of Trebizond
- Reign: 5 March 1417 – 26 April 1429
- Predecessor: Manuel III
- Successor: John IV
- Co-emperor: Alexander (1429)
- Born: c. 1379
- Died: 26 April 1429 (aged c. 50)
- Spouse: Theodora Kantakouzene
- Issue: Elena Megas Komnene; A daughter (wife of Jahan Shah); John IV Megas Komnenos; Maria Megas Komnene; Alexander Megas Komnenos; David Megas Komnenos; Teodora disputed Eudoksia Valenza disputed
- Dynasty: Komnenos
- Father: Manuel III Megas Komnenos
- Mother: Eudokia of Georgia

Alexios IV Megas Komnenos or Alexius IV (Greek: Αλέξιος Μέγας Κομνηνός, romanized: Alexios Megas Komnēnos; c. 1379 – 1429), Emperor of Trebizond from 5 March 1417 to 26 April 1429. He was the son of Emperor Manuel III and his first wife, Eudokia of Georgia.

== Reign ==
Alexios IV had been associated in authority and given the title of despotes by his father as early as 1395. Nevertheless, the two quarreled as Alexios was impatient to assume supreme power; William Miller compared this to "the first three sovereigns of the House of Hanover" for whom "the heir-apparent always quarrelled with his father." When his father died in 1417, Alexios was accused by some of having expedited his death.

Alexios inherited a conflict with the Genoese, who defeated the fleet of Trebizond and seized a local monastery, which they converted into a fortress. By 1418 he had signed a peace agreement and paid reparations to the Genoese until 1422. A new dispute arose over the emperor's obligations in 1425 and was not resolved until 1428. Relations with the Republic of Venice were generally better.

After the death of Tamerlane, most of Asia Minor descended into chaos. Kara Yusuf, ruler of the Kara Koyunlu or "Black Sheep" Turks, devastated much of Armenia and defeated the Emir of Arsinga and the chieftain of the Ak Koyunlu or White Sheep Turks. Alexios sought to avoid hostility by marrying off daughters to his powerful Muslim neighbours. One daughter, was married to Kara Yusuf's son Jihan Shah in c.1420, and Alexios agreed to pay his son-in-law the same amount of tribute that had previously been due to Tamerlane. Another daughter, Theodora, was possibly married to Ali, son of Kara Yülük Osman, the ruler of Ak Koyunlu, though Osman himself was likely the groom. Alexios' marital policy also extended to his Christian neighbours, and his eldest daughter was married to Serbian nobleman, later despot, Djuradj Branković. Alexios IV's youngest daughter Maria of Trebizond was married off to the Byzantine Emperor John VIII Palaiologos in 1427.

According to George Finlay, Alexios IV spent much of his time in pursuit of pleasure and accomplished relatively little, although there is no evidence in contemporary sources for this claim. Following tradition, he granted his eldest son, John IV, the courtly title of despotes in 1417. Despite this, relations deteriorated between father and son, and in 1426 John murdered Alexios' Treasurer, alleging an affair between him and the Empress Theodora Kantakouzene. He also attempted to kill his parents but the nobles intervened and prevented him, and John fled to Georgia.

When Alexios IV's wife Theodora died in 1426, he was so distraught that Bessarion wrote him no less than three monodias, which help to shed some light on this otherwise dark period lacking in sources.

Due to John's disloyalty and usurpation, Alexios IV made his younger son Alexander of Trebizond despotes. Eventually John left Georgia for the Genoese colony at Caffa, where he enlisted a galley and its crew to help him recover his position in Trebizond. On 26 April 1429, the galley and its crew landed John near Trebizond; Alexios IV marched out to meet his son, only to be murdered during the night by nobles who had been won over by John. Alexander fled Trebizond; the Venetian traveller Pero Tafur encountered him in Constantinople around October of that year, living with his sister Maria.

== Burial ==
According to Anthony Bryer, John IV felt remorse for his father's death and one of the three indications Bryer provides is a free-standing tomb he had constructed outside of the Chrysokephalos cathedral, into which he moved his father's remains from its burial spot inside the cathedral. Due to a Turkish tradition that the tomb housed the body of a Turkish hero of the last siege of Trebizond, it was spared until 1918. In 1916, during the Russian occupation of Trebizond, Fyodor Uspensky excavated the tomb, finding one skeleton facing face, and a second one interred afterwards. The older skeleton Bryer, following Uspenskij's report, identified as Alexios'.

On the Russian withdrawal from Trebizond, the older skeleton was entrusted to Chrysanthos Philippides, then Metropolitan of Trebizond; the tomb outside the Chrysokephalos was destroyed by the Turks. During the 1923 Exchange of Populations, Chaldian antiquary George Kandilaptes collected as much of these bones as he could and brought them to Greece, where they were stored in the Byzantine and Christian Museum in Athens. Then in 1980 the remains of Alexios IV Megas Komnenos were brought with much ceremony to a final resting place in New Soumela, near Kastania in Imathia. Bryer comments that "Alexios IV's is probably the only surviving skeleton of a Byzantine emperor", only to correct himself in a footnote that the remains of St Theodora, John Tzimiskes, and the thirteenth-century Dukai of the Despotate of Epirus might also survive.

== Marriage and children ==
In 1395, Alexios married Theodora Kantakouzene. They had at least six children:

- Elena of Trebizond (c.1395 - 1410) - married despot Đurađ Branković of Serbia, as his first wife
- A daughter who married Jahan Shah.
- John IV of Trebizond (c. 1403 - 1459).
- Maria of Trebizond (c. 1404 - 1439). Married John VIII Palaiologos.
- Alexander of Trebizond. Co-Emperor with his father. Married Maria Gattilusio, a daughter of Dorino of Lesbos.
- David of Trebizond (c. 1408 - 1463).

Two further daughters have been attributed to Alexios by later genealogists. Michel Kuršanskis has argued these marriages never really happened, and their existence is based on a misreading of an interpolation to Chalcondyles. These daughters are:

- Theodora of Trebizond, presumed wife of Ali Beg of the Ak Koyunlu. There is not mention of this marriage in any contemporany source. It is possible that she was confused with Theodora Despina, daughter of John IV and wife of Uzun Hassan, son of Ali Beg. An other option was that the Alexios' Theodora married instead Osman Beg, father of Ali.
- Eudoksia Valenza of Trebizond, wife of Niccolò Crispo, Lord of Syros. She was proposed as the daughter of Alexios when Ambassador Caterino Zeno's claim in his notes that she was the daughter of John IV proved to be false or an his error. Other historians argue instead that she was a Genoese woman.

Alexios IV of Trebizond Komnenid dynasty Born: 1382 Died: 1429
Regnal titles
Preceded by Manuel III	Emperor of Trebizond; 1417–1429	Succeeded by John IV
