= Pedro Tafur =

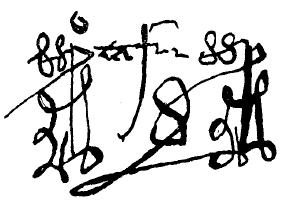
Reproduction of Tafur's signature

Pedro Tafur (or Pero Tafur) (c. 1410 – c. 1484) was a traveller, historian and writer from Castile (modern day Spain).

== Birth ==
Born in Córdoba, to a branch of the noble house of Guzmán,

== Voyage and writings ==
Tafur traveled across three continents during the years 1436 to 1439. During the voyage, he participated in various battles, visited shrines, and rendered diplomatic services for Juan II of Castile. He visited the Moroccan coast, southern France, the Holy Land, Egypt, Rhodes, Cyprus, Tenedos, Trebizond, Caffa, and Constantinople. He also visited the Sinai Peninsula, where he met Niccolò Da Conti, who shared with Tafur information about southeastern Asia. Before returning to Spain, Tafur crossed central Europe and Italy.

He wrote a book called Andanças e viajes de Pero Tafur por diversas partes del mundo avidos (Adventures and Travels of Pero Tafur Happened in Various Parts of the World) in 1453 and 1454, judging from interior evidence in the only surviving manuscript, but it did not appear in print until its publication by Marcos Jiménez de la Espada in 1874. It is one of the few books written by a Spanish medieval traveler, Ruy González de Clavijo's book being another example). Tafur dedicates his book to a member of the Guzmán family, the same family to which Saint Dominic belonged, thus providing biographical information about this saint. He also provides valuable details concerning the Baths of Zeuxippus, the Hagia Sophia, the Holy doors in Rome, and the obelisks in Rome.

== Life back in Spain ==
Having returned to Spain in 1439, Tafur married Doña Juana de Horozco some time before 1451. A son appears to have predeceased him, but three daughters are mentioned in Doña Juana's will. Tafur played a prominent role in local affairs: he and his son both held office as aldermen in 1479.

== See also ==
- Juan Tafur
- Martín Yañéz Tafur
