= Madonna di sant'Alessio =

Christian icon

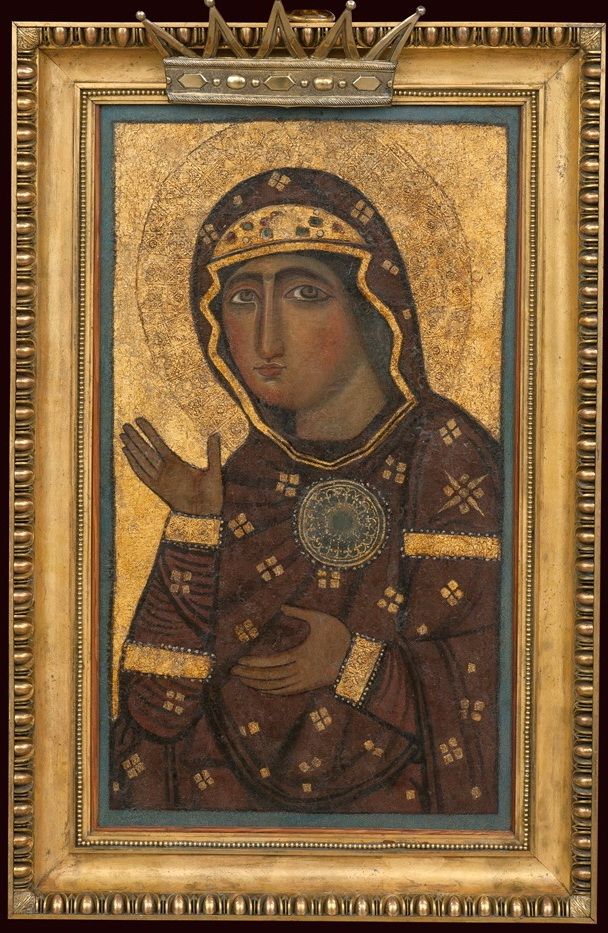
Icon of Madonna di Sant’ Alessio (Madonna of St. Alexis; Madonna of Intercession)

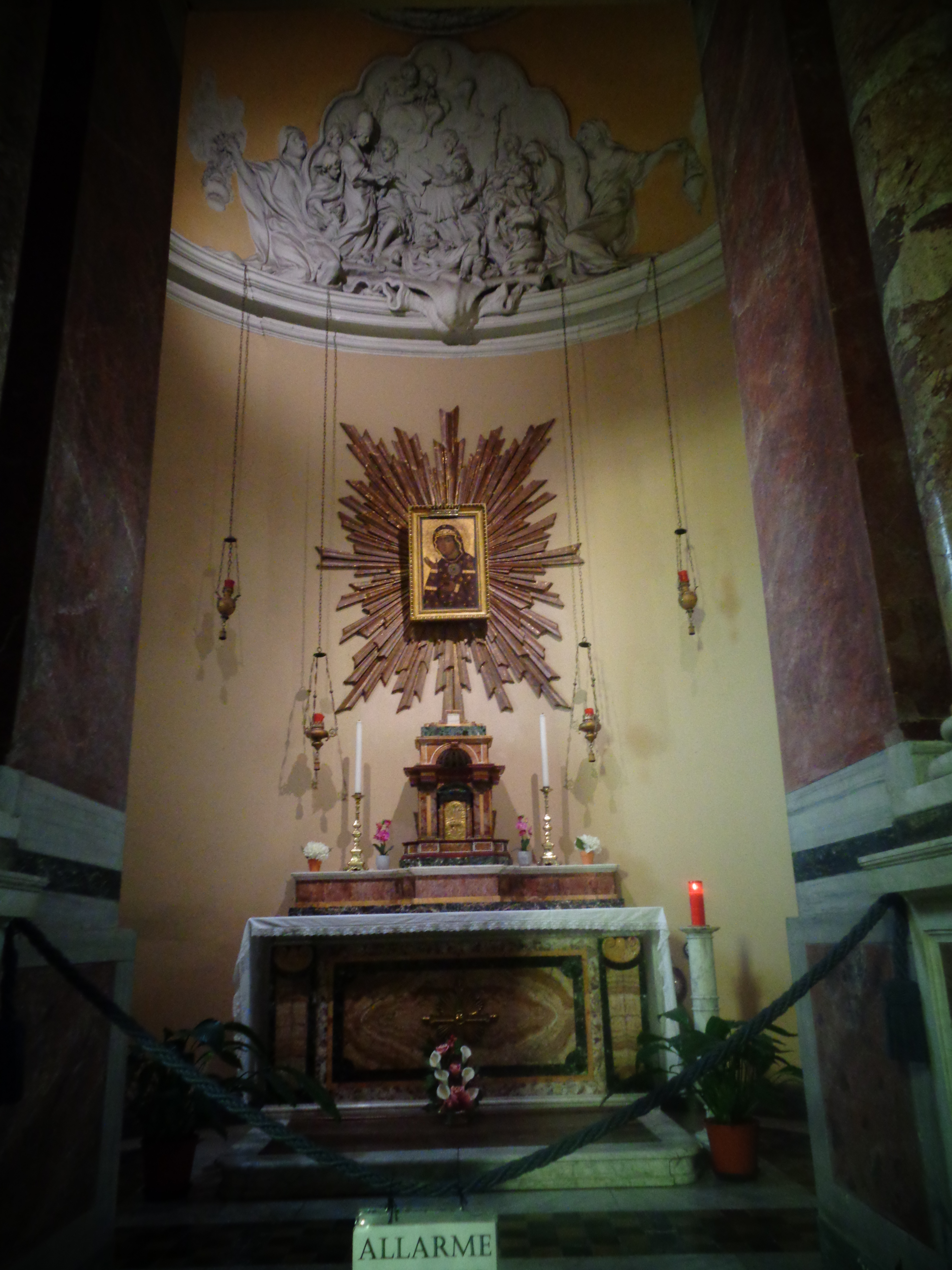
The Chapel of the Most Holy Sacrament and Madonna di Sant'Alessio in Basilica of the Saints Bonifacio and Alexis

Madonna di Sant'Alessio (Madonna of St. Alexis; Madonna of Intercession) is an icon, probably of Byzantine origin, of the Blessed Virgin now in the Basilica of the Saints Bonifacio and Alexis on the Aventine Hill in Rome, Italy.

It is one of the most venerated Christian icons (dated at the 12-13th centuries), attracting many Christian pilgrims of different religious denominations from all over the world as it is considered to be miraculous, according to tradition. Like some other old icons it was believed to have been painted by St Luke the Evangelist from its living subjects.

== Art history ==
The Madonna di Sant’Alessio is a fine and early example of the iconography of the Haghiosoritissa type (Paraklesis). The Icon of the "Madonna di Sant’Alessio" is thought to have been painted in Byzantium. It was painted with tempera on canvas. The cloth was pasted on a wooden board (probably of cedar) measuring 70 x 40 cm.

Art and church historians disagree about when the icon was created. According to older church traditions, the icon dates to the Early Christian period. However, today most art historians believe the date of the Madonna of St. Alexis is either the 12th and the 13th century. In Italy this icon is known as ''«Madonna di Edessa» ("Edessa Icon of Madonna"), «Madonna Avvocata» («Protectress»)'' and ''«Madonna dell'Intercessione» («Our Lady of Intercession" ) since it matches the poses of the Virgin in the common image of the Deesis, a Greek word that means "supplication"). In the Deesis the mercy of Christ as judge is invoked by figures of the Virgin and Saint John the Evangelist flanking Christ. More specifically: the icon of the Madonna of St. Alexis refers to the theme of the prayer of Intercession in a way that is different from the scenes in which the Lord is represented. It has a connection with a certain type of Marian imagery that can be found both in Constantinople and in Rome.

The Madonna on the icon is represented without the Child, turning to a side, with the upper body slightly inclined as though carrying a weight, with one hand extended forward and the other raised to indicate that she intercedes for those who have no other hope but in Her alone. The Madonna of St. Alexis reveals faithful adherence to the Byzantine pattern. One element is the dimness and softness of the colors, while some other details (asymmetric shape of the lengthened face, eyes with intense look, wide and thin mouth) reveal the search of a dramatic effect on the part of the artist.

The Icon must have undergone some renovations over the centuries. Probably there was some retouching on the occasion of its Canonical coronation that took place in 1645 by Pontifical decree granted from Pope Innocent X.

In 1952 the icon underwent restoration and cleaning on the Somascan Fathers' initiative. In 2014-2015 the High Institute for Conservation and Restoration (ISCR) in Rome carried out another restoration of the "Madonna of St. Alexius" after which it was returned to Basilica of St. Alexius.

== Legend ==
According to the legend, the icon was brought to Rome by the metropolitan Sergius Damascus in 977, after it had been kept in Edessa church of the Blessed Virgin for a long time. There had been many miracles from the icon so that it was known as a miraculous image. The history of the icon is closely related to the legend about St. Alexius, the only son of Euphemianus, a wealthy Christian Roman of the senatorial class. Alexius fled his arranged marriage to follow his holy vocation. Disguised as a beggar, he lived on the porch of the church in Edessa (Mesopotamia) for seventeen years. Eating only bread and drinking only water he prayed day and night near the icon of the Blessed Virgin, accepting alms, even from his own household slaves, who had been sent to look for him but did not recognize him, until a miraculous voice of the Blessed Virgin Mary from the Icon singled him out as a "Man of God".

Fleeing the resultant notoriety, he returned to Rome, so changed that his parents did not recognize him, but as good Christians took him in and sheltered him for seventeen years, which he spent in a dark cubbyhole beneath the stairs, praying and teaching catechism to children. After his death, his family found writings on his body which told them who he was and how he had lived his life of penance from the day of his wedding, for the love of God. So the icon from an Edessa church where Alexis had prayed daily for seventeen years, was called the "Madonna of St. Alexis".

When the icon was brought to Rome, it was placed in the church dedicated to St. Alexius (Basilica of the Saints Bonifacio and Alexis) where his holy relics could be found. According to another legendary version, the icon is thought to have been brought from the East by St. Alexius himself. The "Madonna di Sant’Alessio" is a wonderful object of interest and devotion to be seen in the Chapel of the Most Holy Sacrament on the right side of the south transept of the basilica. The Chapel was built by Abbot Angelo Porro in 1674, restructured in 1750-1755, modified in 1814 by Charles IV of Spain (during his exile in the monastery of St. Alexis). It was restored by Antonio Munoz in 1935. The icon can be found above the altar of this Chapel.

In Rome there are six other icons of this type: the Madonna Aracoeli of Santa Maria in Ara Coeli in the basilica beside the "Campidoglio," the Maria Advocata in Chiesa della Madonna del Rosario, one in Galleria Nazionale d'Arte Antica, one in Santa Maria della Concezione in Campo Marzio, one in Santa Maria in Via Lata, one in San Lorenzo in Damaso, and one in Santa Maria Maggiore.

== Bibliography ==
- Holweck, F. G., "A Biographical Dictionary of the Saints", St. Louis, Missouri: B. Herder Book Co., 1924.
