= Agiosoritissa =

Type of Marian icon in Byzantine art

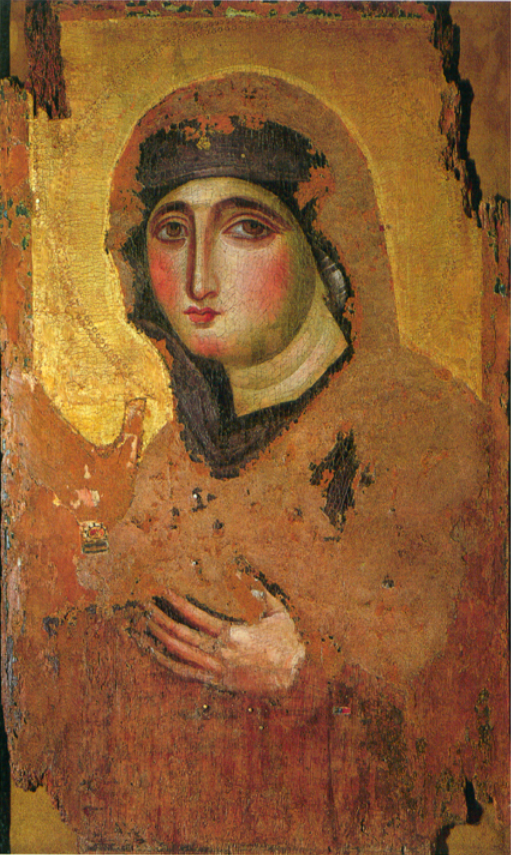
Maria Advocata (Madonna del Rosario), c. 6th century

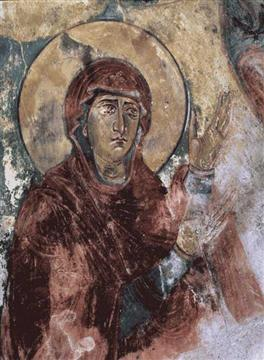
Georgian Agiosoritissa icon (c. 1100)

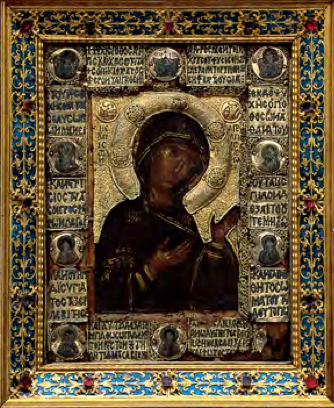
Freising Agiasoritissa, 12th century

The Panagia Agiosoritissa or Hagiosoritissa (Greek: Ἁγιοσορίτισσα) is the name for a type of Marian icon, showing Mary without the Christ Child, slightly from the side with both hands raised in prayer. The type is known in Latin as Maria Advocata.

== Names ==
The names used for the icon, Hagiosoritissa and, in Russian, Khalkopratiskaya (Халкопратийская), derive from the church of the Holy Urn (Greek: Ἁγία Σορός, in reference to the urn containing the Cincture of the Theotokos) in Constantinople's Chalkoprateia (Χαλκοπρατεῖα, "copper market") district.

In English, the type is also known as Madonna Advocate (the prayer gesture interpreted as an act of intercession on behalf of the faithful).

== History ==
The appellation Ἁγιοσορίτισσα is first recorded in Byzantine seals of the 11th century, and it appears minted on coins made under Manuel I Komnenos (r. 1143–1180).

The type was widespread in the Byzantine empire and in the Balkans, but less so in Russia.

== Examples ==
Such an icon is known to have been in the Hagios Demetrios basilica in Thessalonica in the 6th century, but was lost in the Byzantine Iconoclasm.

An early Byzantine icon (7th century?) is preserved in the church of Santa Maria del Rosario on the Monte Mario, Rome.

The Madonna di sant'Alessio in the Basilica of the Saints Bonifacio and Alexis on the Aventine Hill in Rome is also of the type.

An early Russian example is the Theotokos of Bogolyubovo (12th century). The church of Santa Maria in Via Lata in Rome has a 13th-century icon of this type.

The treasury of the Basilica of Our Lady, Maastricht has an 11th century enamel decorated plaque intended for a reliquary, that depicts an image of the Panagia Agiosoritissa. The high-quality enamel work is very colorful in shades of blue, green, red, yellow, and white accented by meticulously shaped gold cloison patterns. The piece was made in a fine imperial workshop that was located in Constantinople. Mary's facial features are accentuated with gold cloison outlines. She is shown wearing a dark blue maphorion, with her hands clasped in prayer and her face turned towards Jesus.

== See also ==
- Blachernitissa
- Deesis
- Hodegetria
- Salus Populi Romani

== Sources ==
- O. E. Etingof, Агиосоритисса, Православная энциклопедия vol. 1 (2000), p. 254. (in Russian)
- David Lathoud, "Le sanctuaire de la Vierge des Chalcopratia", Échos d'Orient 23 (1924), 36–62.
- Tommaso Bertelè, "La Vergine aghiosoritissa nella numismatica bizantina", Revue des études byzantines 16 (1958), 233f.
- M. Andaloro, "Note sui temi iconografici della Deesis e dell'Hagiosoritissa", Riv. dell'Istituto Nazionale di Archeologia e Storia dell'Arte 17 (1970), 85–130.
