= Giovanni Vincenzo Gonzaga =

Italian cardinal

Giovanni Vincenzo Gonzaga (1540–1591) was an Italian Roman Catholic cardinal.

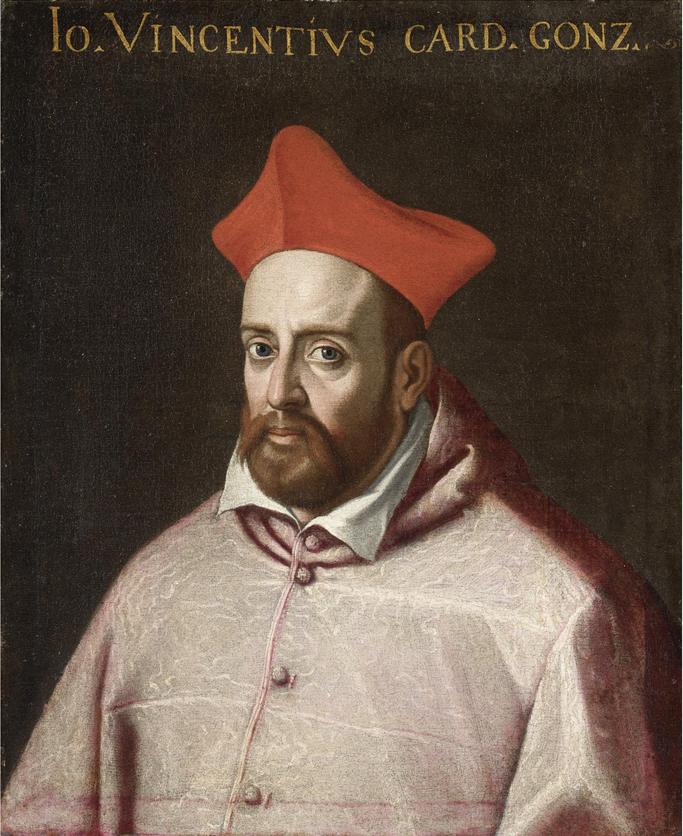
Portrait of Cardinal Giovanni Vincenzo Gonzaga.

== Biography ==
A member of the House of Gonzaga, Giovanni Vincenzo Gonzaga was born in Palermo on December 8, 1540, the son of Ferrante Gonzaga and his wife Isabella di Capua. He was the younger brother of Cardinal Francesco Gonzaga and the nephew of Cardinal Ercole Gonzaga.

As a young man, his kinsman Guglielmo Gonzaga, Duke of Mantua called him to Mantua to assist him in the government of the Duchy of Mantua. There, he became a member of the Knights Hospitaller. He was also made Prior of Barletta.

Pope Gregory XIII made him a cardinal deacon in the consistory of February 21, 1578. He received the red hat and the deaconry of San Giorgio in Velabro on November 21, 1578. On December 19, 1583, he opted for the deaconry of Santa Maria in Cosmedin.

He participated in the papal conclave of 1585 that elected Pope Sixtus V. On December 18, 1585, he opted for the order of cardinal priests and his deaconry was raised pro illa vice to the status of a titular church. He opted for the titular church of Santi Bonifacio e Alessio on April 20, 1587. Pope Sixtus V named him auditor of causes for citizens of the Papal States.

He participated in the first papal conclave of 1590 that elected Pope Urban VII; in the second papal conclave of 1590 that elected Pope Gregory XIV; and in the papal conclave of 1591 that elected Pope Innocent IX.

He died in Rome on December 23, 1591. He was buried in his titular church of Santi Bonifacio de Alessio.
