= Saint Luke painting the Virgin =

Devotional subject in art

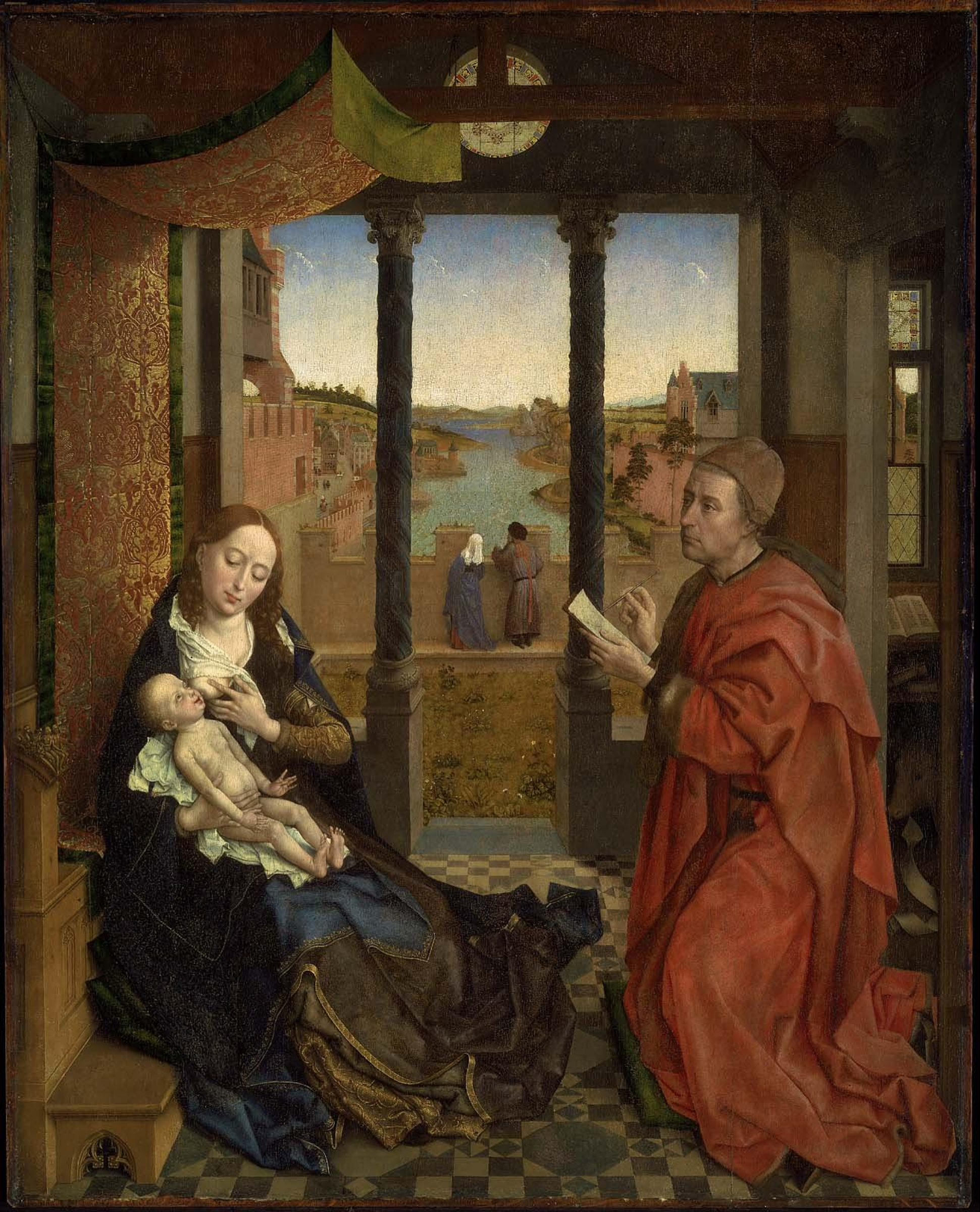
Saint Luke Drawing the Virgin, by Rogier van der Weyden, c. 1435–1440, Museum of Fine Arts in Boston

Saint Luke painting the Virgin (German and Dutch: Lukas-Madonna) is a devotional subject in art showing Luke the Evangelist painting the Virgin Mary with the Child Jesus. Such paintings were often created during the Renaissance for chapels of Saint Luke in European churches, and frequently recall the composition of the Salus Populi Romani, an icon based on the legend of Luke's portrait of Mary. Versions of the subject were sometimes painted as the masterpiece that many guilds required an artist to submit before receiving the title of master.

== History ==
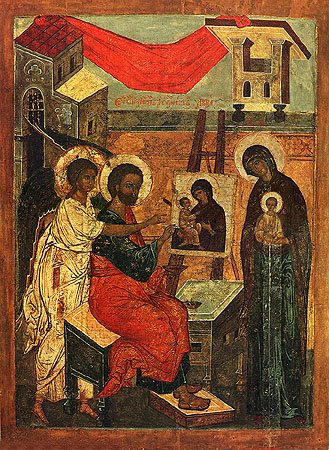
16th-century Russian version showing copy of the Theotokos of Vladimir

Though not included in the canonic pictorial of Mary's life, the scene became increasingly popular as Saint Luke gained his own devotional following as the patron saint of artists in general, and more specifically as patron saint of the Guild of Saint Luke, the most common name of local painters' guilds. The legend of Saint Luke as the author of the first Christian icons had been developed in Byzantium during the Iconoclastic Controversy, as attested by 8th century sources. By the 11th century, a number of images started being attributed to his authorship and venerated as authentic portraits of Christ and the Virgin Mary. In the Late Middle Ages and the Renaissance, Luke's ascendancy paralleled a rise in status of painters themselves, whereas before the Renaissance, sculptors' guilds and their associated craftsmen—which also included masons and architects, as all worked with stone—tended to be regarded more highly than painters. Many Guilds of St. Luke were conglomerate associations of various professions, including painters, paint-mixers, book illuminators, and sellers of all of these things. Saddle-makers too were members of these guilds: like illuminators, who worked with vellum, they too painted on leather when creating the colorful military harness of the day.

== Early versions ==
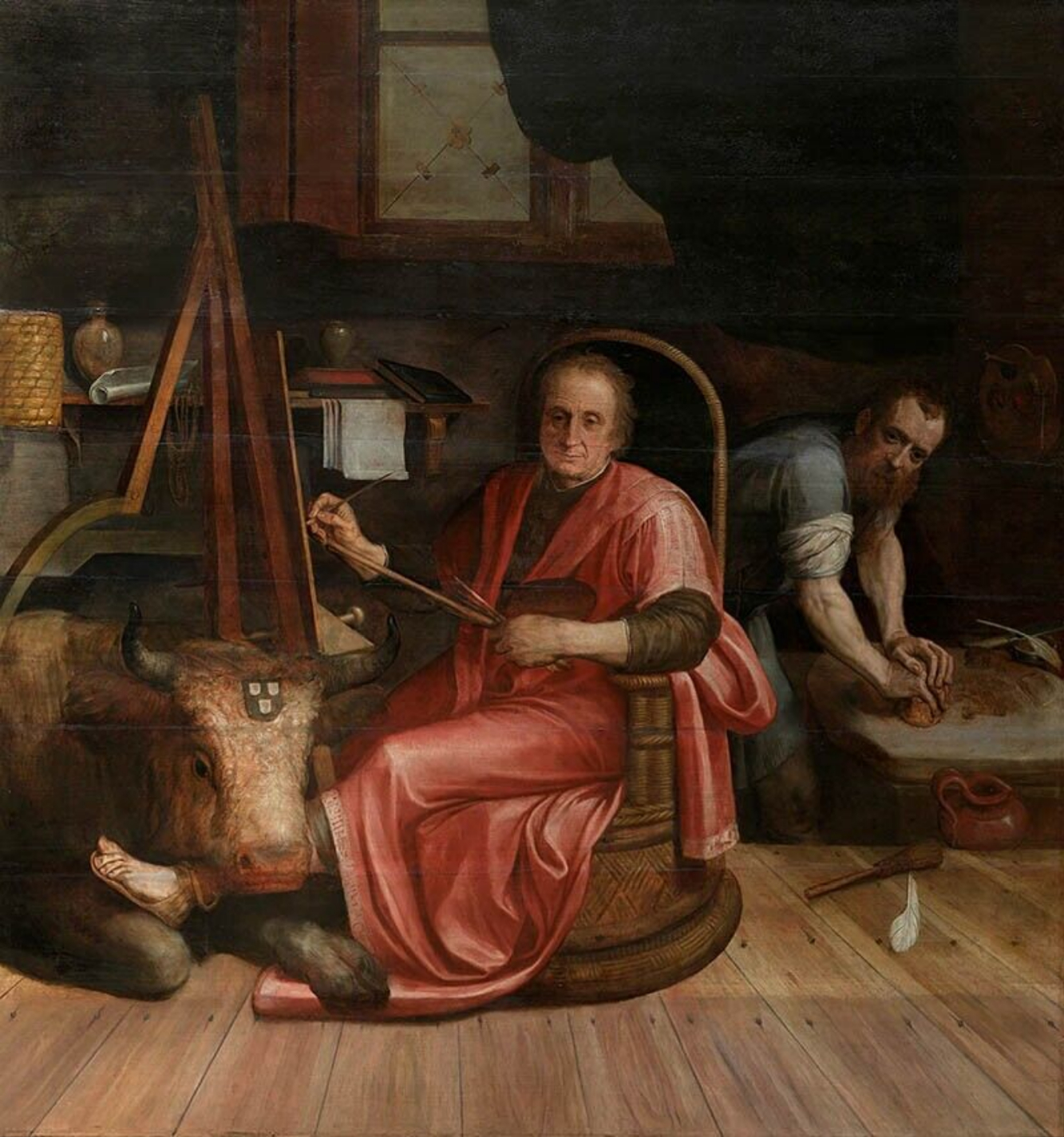
Frans Floris depicted his friend the painter Rijckaert Aertsz as Saint Luke. Floris himself models the pigment grinder, c. 1560.

The earliest known version of this theme in Byzantine art is a 12th-century miniature in a Greek lectionary (Greek 233) preserved in the Saint Catherine's Monastery on Mount Sinai. The theme appears in Western art in the second half of the 14th century (miniature in the Evangeliary of Johannes von Troppau, now in Vienna) and will be frequently represented in Italian and Early Netherlandish art of the 15th century. Rogier van der Weyden's version is the earliest known in Early Netherlandish painting. It is in Boston and copies of which are in Bruges, where it was originally painted, Alte Pinakothek, Munich, and the Hermitage.

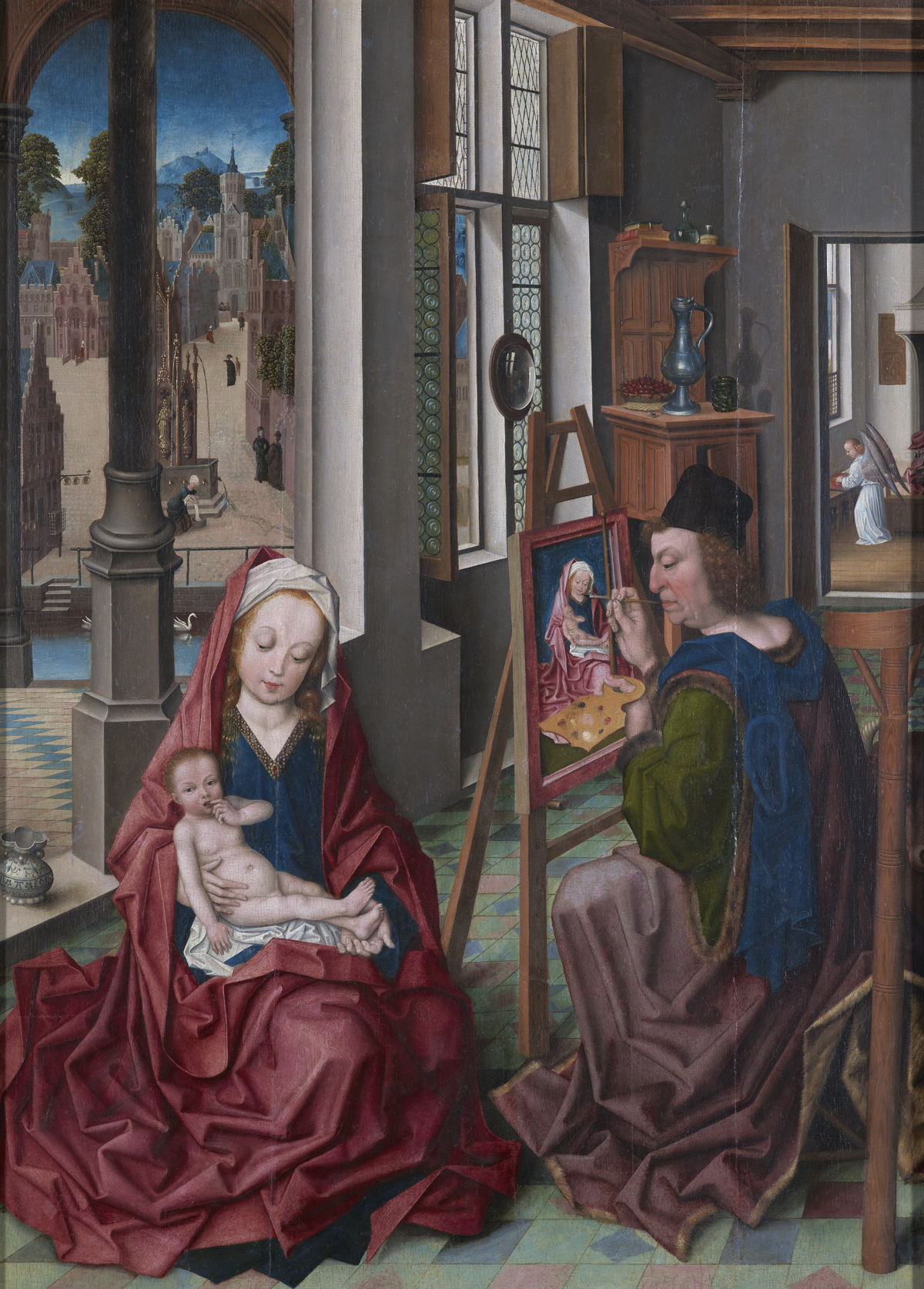
Derick Baegert, circa 1470

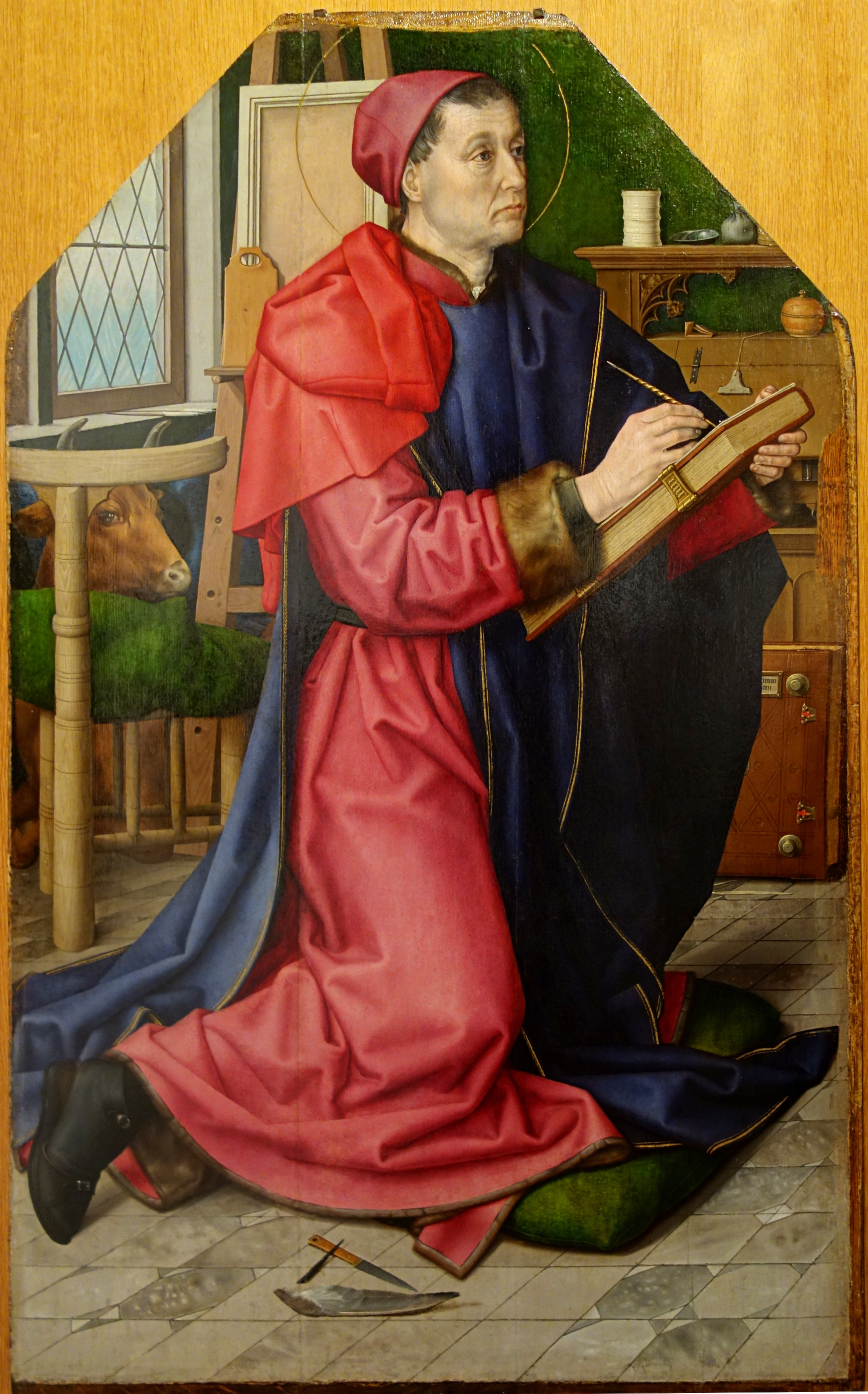
Hugo van der Goes, 1490s

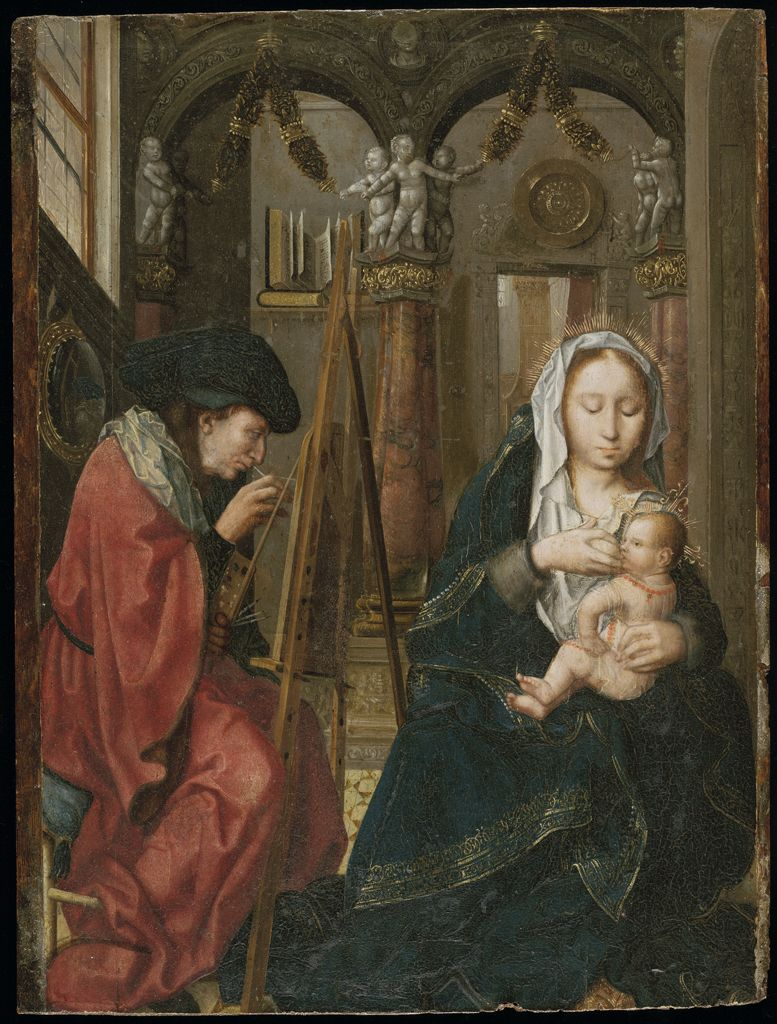
Master of the Holy Blood, 1510s

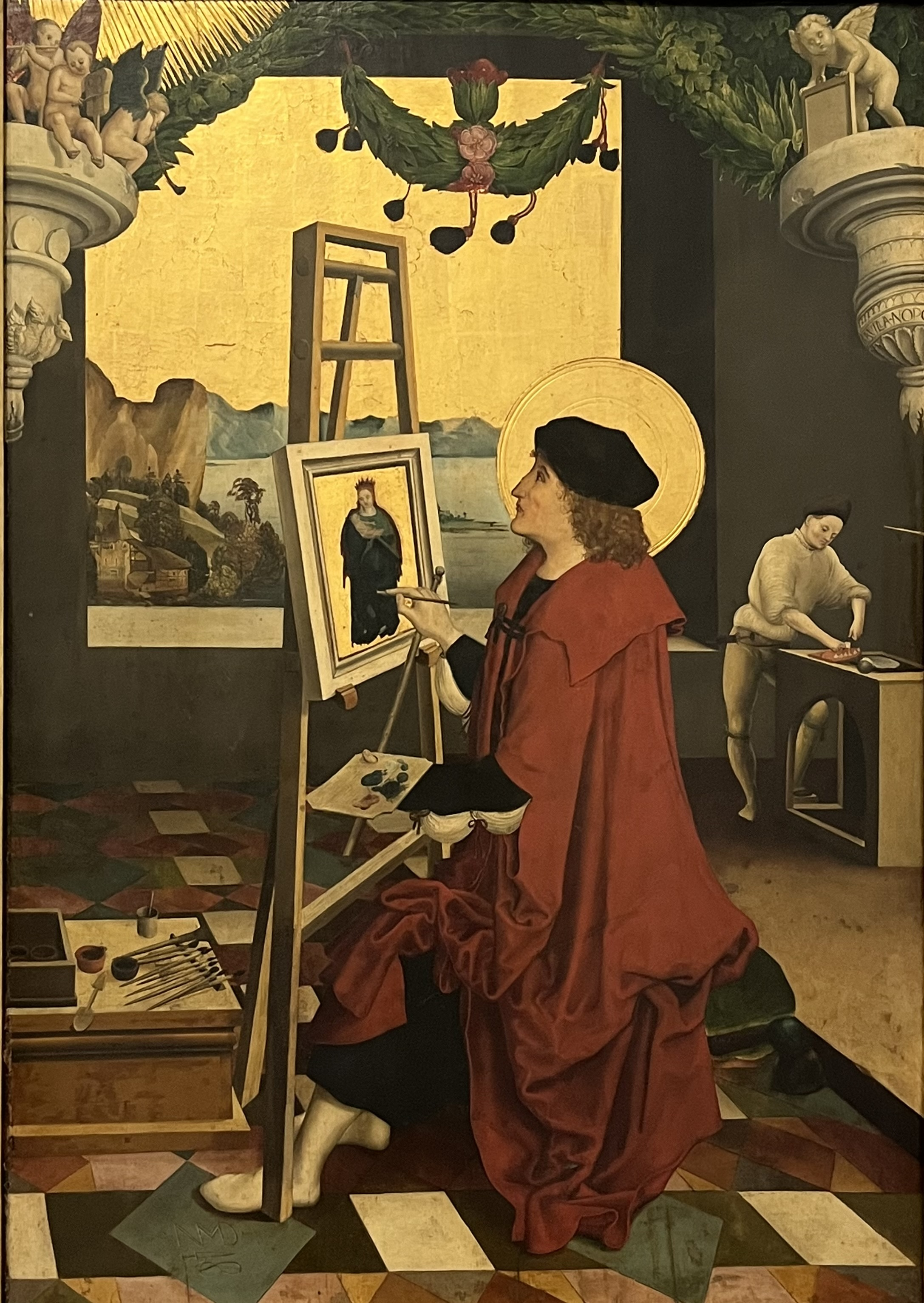
Niklaus Manuel Deutsch

== Self-portrait ==
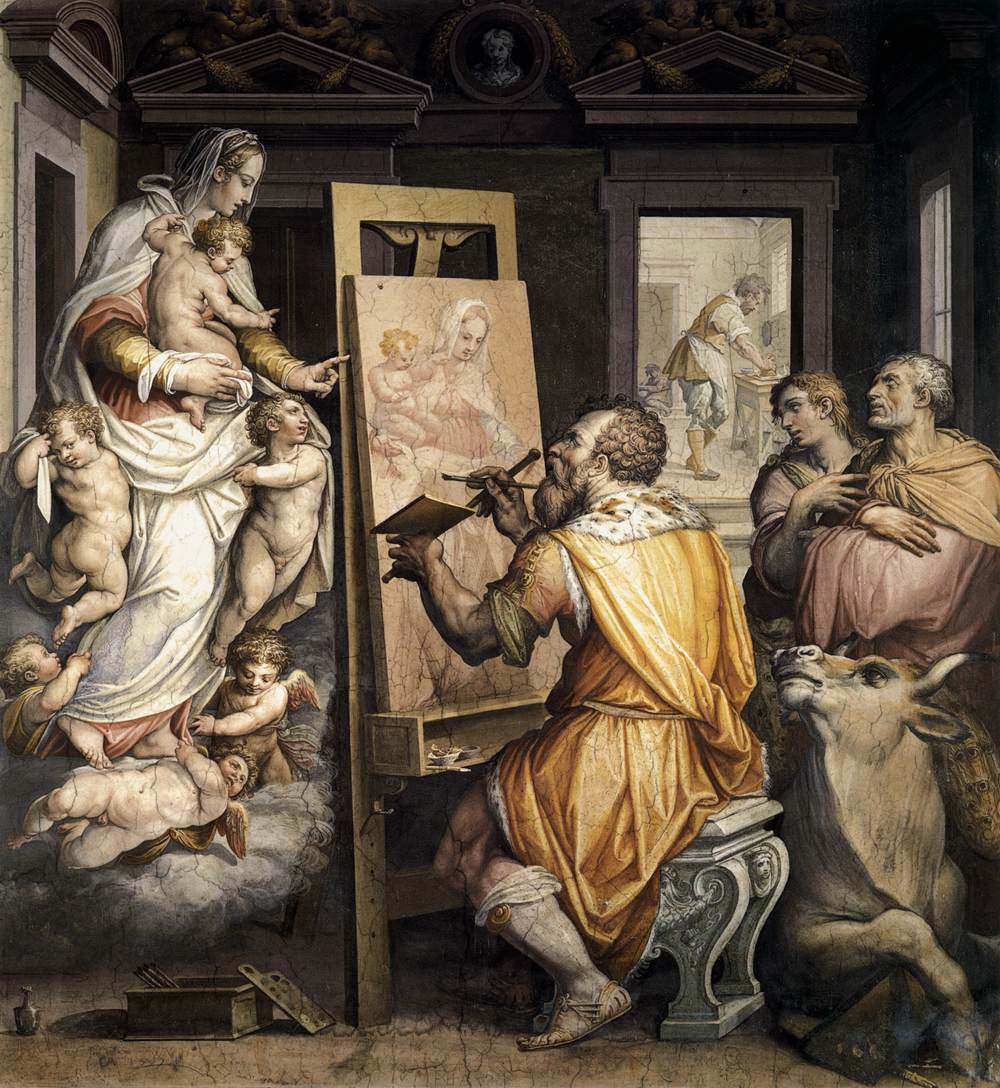
Giorgio Vasari paints himself and the Virgin, 1565.

Traditionally, the donor of the painting to the chapel is the Guild of Saint Luke, which often appointed its best painter for the job. If the painting never found its way into a church, it was hung in the Guildhall. This painter then painted a self-portrait, although in some cases St. Luke is accompanied by a helper or admirer, and sometimes this is the self-portrait.

== Iconography ==
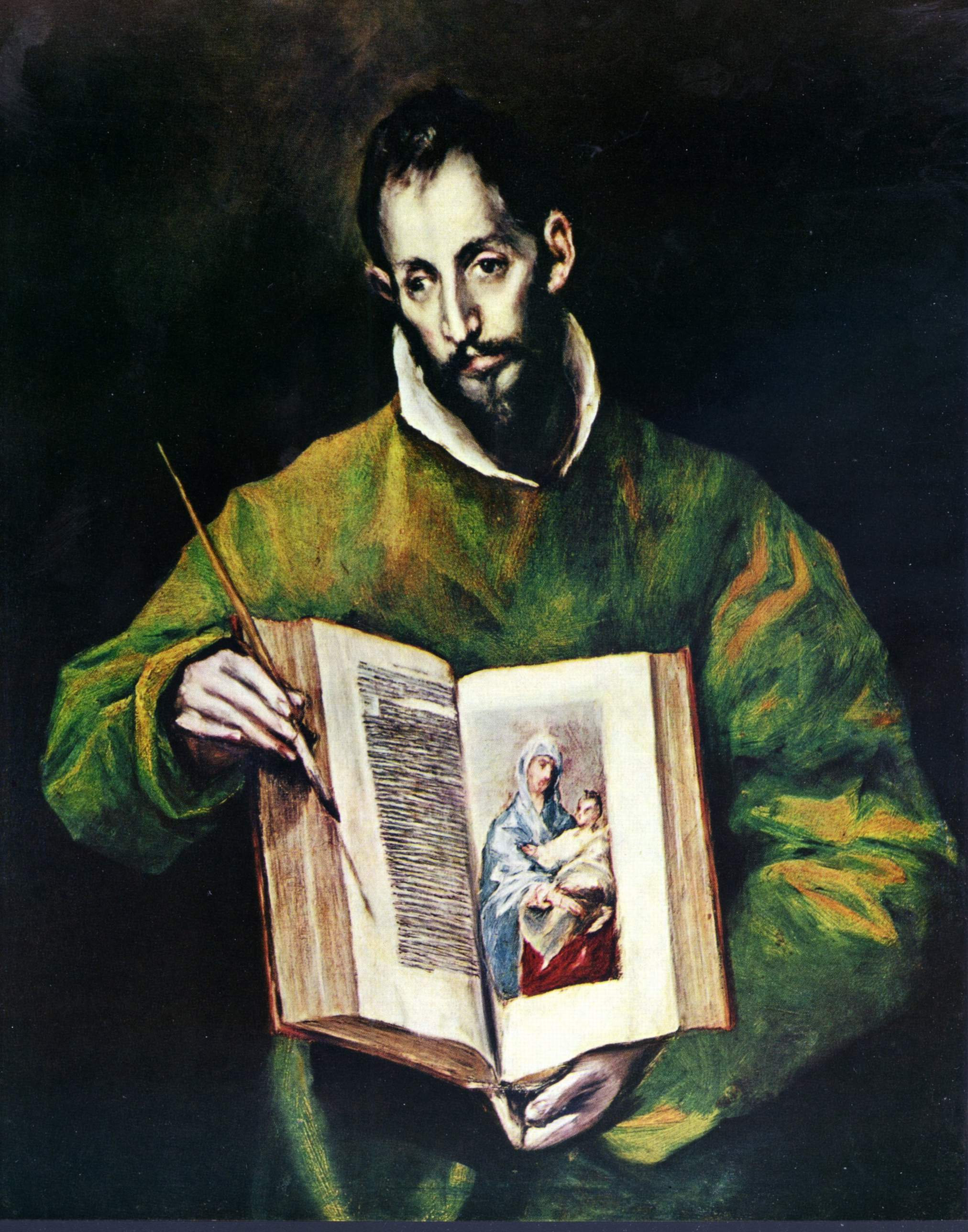
El Greco, 1608, Toledo

The attributes in such paintings tell a story about the art of painting through the centuries. In the Rogier van der Weyden and El Greco versions, the painter seems to be making a miniature on his own, while in other versions the painter is shown at his easel, using a maulstick, with the flesh tones present on a palette for the incarnation of the scene. Often a worker is seen mixing paint in the background. Though typically the subject of the painting is shown twice, once in the flesh and once on the easel, sometimes it seems as though Maria and Jesus are too holy to be shown incarnate, which is possibly the case with the painting by El Greco, since the painter's face seems paler than the subject.

== See also ==
- Maria Advocata (Madonna del Rosario)
