= Maria Advocata (Madonna del Rosario) =

Marian icon in Rome (c. 6th century)

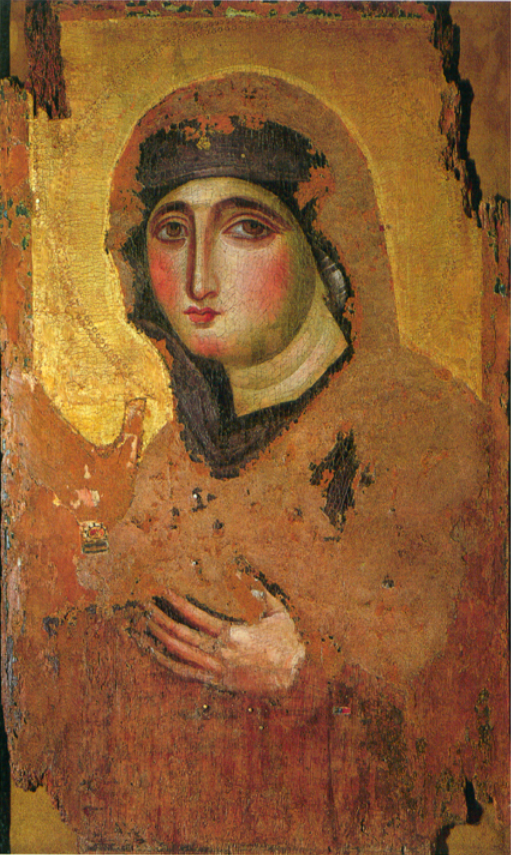
The Madonna del Rosario, c. 6th century, (70.2 x 40.5 cm)

The Madonna del Rosario is an icon of Mary commonly dated to the sixth century or earlier. It is an early version of a type of icon known as the Agiosoritissa or the Maria Advocata, in which Mary is depicted without the Christ Child, with both hands raised. The work, which has been kept in the Church of the Madonna del Rosario since 1931, is thought to be the oldest extant image of Mary in Rome, Italy. Medieval tradition held that the icon was painted by Luke the Evangelist.

The painting is known by various names, and is often simply called Maria Advocata, since it was long the only example of the type in Rome. It has also been named for the various churches where it has been enshrined, such as Madonna in Tempulo, Madonna di San Sisto, Madonna di Santi Domenico e Sisto, or, as it is called presently, Madonna del Rosario.

== Relation to Luke the Evangelist ==
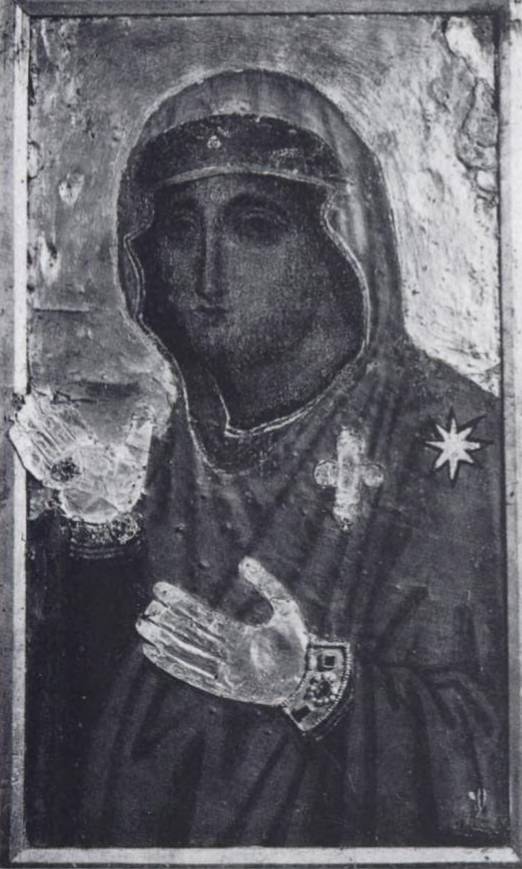
The icon prior to restoration in 1960

Since the Gospel of Luke contains material about Mary not found in the other canonical gospels, the tradition arose early in Christian history that Mary herself was among the eyewitnesses Luke claimed in his prologue to have consulted in composing his narrative. The close connection between Luke and Mary was reinforced by the tradition that Luke was an artist, perhaps the first to compose an icon of Mary.

By 1100, the Madonna del Rosario was being referred to as Luke's handiwork. By 1200, it was one of only two icons with claims to Lukan authorship, along with Salus Populi Romani, another early icon housed in Santa Maria Maggiore.

== Iconography ==
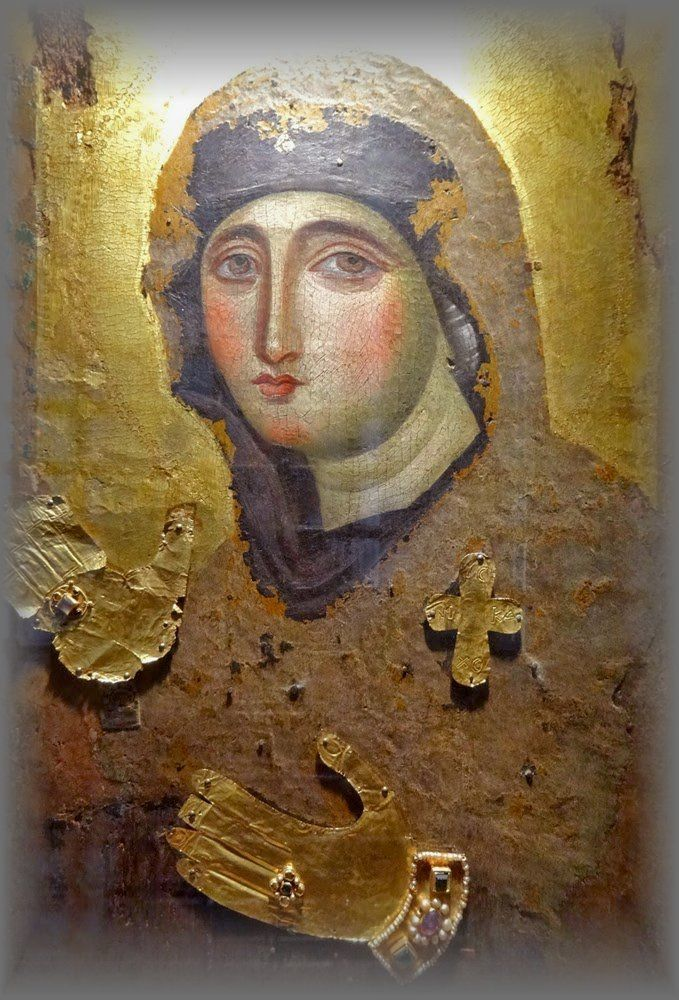
The replica with golden hand coverings

The icon was painted using the ancient encaustic technique and had a gold background from the start. The technique is Egyptian, and the Madonna closely resembles the Fayum mummy portraits of Upper Egypt. However, the style of the painting, with its oval face and large eyes, has been called "distinctively Syrian".

During the restoration and examination from 12 February to 28 June 1960, the result of the expert examination was recorded:

Location: Rome. Painter: unknown. Dimensions: 70.2 x 40.5 cm (27.6 x 25.9 in). Panel thickness: 0.5 cm (0.2 in). Type of wood: maybe linden, in any case so worn that it is difficult to determine its age. A copper plate holds the image together from behind, so X-rays are impossible.

The linden wood on the painting ground is badly eaten away, but the portrait as a whole, especially the face, the gold nimbus and one hand, are still clearly visible. In later times, Mary's interceding hands were covered with gold sheets to protect them from devotional kisses, and a gold cross was added to her shoulder.

The icon belongs to the iconographic type of Hagiosoritissa (Greek: Ἁγιοσορίτισσα, from hagios, "holy" and soros, "shrine"), i.e. the "Icon at the Holy Shrine" in the former Chalkoprateia Church in Constantinople. The more common name is Maria Advocata ("Mary as intercessor", from Greek Paraklesis). In the choice of motif for Marian icons, representations of Mary without the Child Jesus (Advocata) preceded the images of Mary with Him (e.g. Hodegetria).

Here, Mary is depicted without Jesus in a sideways half-length figure, eyes directed at the viewer, both hands raised in supplication. Her head is covered by a shawl (maphorion) with a star on her brow; this spica ("ear of corn") was seen a symbol of virginity, derived from the brightest star of the same name in the constellation Virgo. The old jewellery on her dress and wrists can still be seen. The golden nimbus is set off from the rest of the gold background by slight hallmarking. How Mary intercedes is made clear by the artist painting the right hand raised to the shoulder beyond the edge of the picture to the border of the icon. With her hands raised and with a slight turn of her body, Mary turns to Jesus Christ, so to speak, out of the picture, in order to give Him suppliants’ requests.

In this context, it is significant that the icon of the Madonna di San Sisto (= Maria Advocata) was carried in procession on the eve of the Assumption (15 August); this icon and an icon of Christ Pantokrator from the Lateran Palace, which was also carried along, are made to bow to each other. The latter is said to have been one of the oldest images of Christ, and not created by human hands (Greek: ἀχειροποίητον, acheiropoieton), now in the Sancta Sanctorum chapel of the Lateran Palace. The route of this procession initially led from the Lateran via the Via Sacra and Sant'Adriano at the Roman Forum to Santa Maria Maggiore, later also stopping in front of Santa Francesca Romana and San Sisto Vecchio. The model for this Roman procession were processions with icons of Christ and the Mother of God in Constantinople dating to the 6th century, where the icons assumed a quasi-personal character and acted as individuals.

Until the 10th century, the primacy of the five oldest and most important Marian icons in Rome was disputed, although they sometimes belonged to different iconographic categories: Maria Advocata from San Sisto Vecchio (6th century), Regina Coeli (since the 19th century Salus Populi Romani) from Santa Maria Maggiore (6th/7th century), Madonna del Conforto from Santa Maria Antiqua and then Santa Francesca Romana (6th/7th century), the temple image of Mary from Santa Maria ad Martyres (6th/7th century), and Madonna della Clemenza from Santa Maria in Trastevere (7th century). According to Hans Belting's research, it is likely that the Maria Advocata of San Sisto played the leading role during the August procession of the Assumption since the 10th century; she was also the first icon of Mary in Rome, and was expressly declared to be an image of Luke around 1100.

Among these early Roman Marian images, Maria Advocata was the oldest and most famous icon: she was the only one painted on a gold background, occupied a privileged position in the August processions and more early copies were made of her than of any other Marian icon in Rome. These copies of the Advocata were particularly sought after because they also took part in the special veneration of the oldest icon of Mary and were also carried in processions in Rome and Latium. However, only the icons of the iconographic type of Mary as intercessor and not those of the Hodegetria and other types count as such copies. The copies of the Advocata that have survived to this day include, such as the icon in Santa Maria in Aracoeli (8th/9th and 12th centuries).

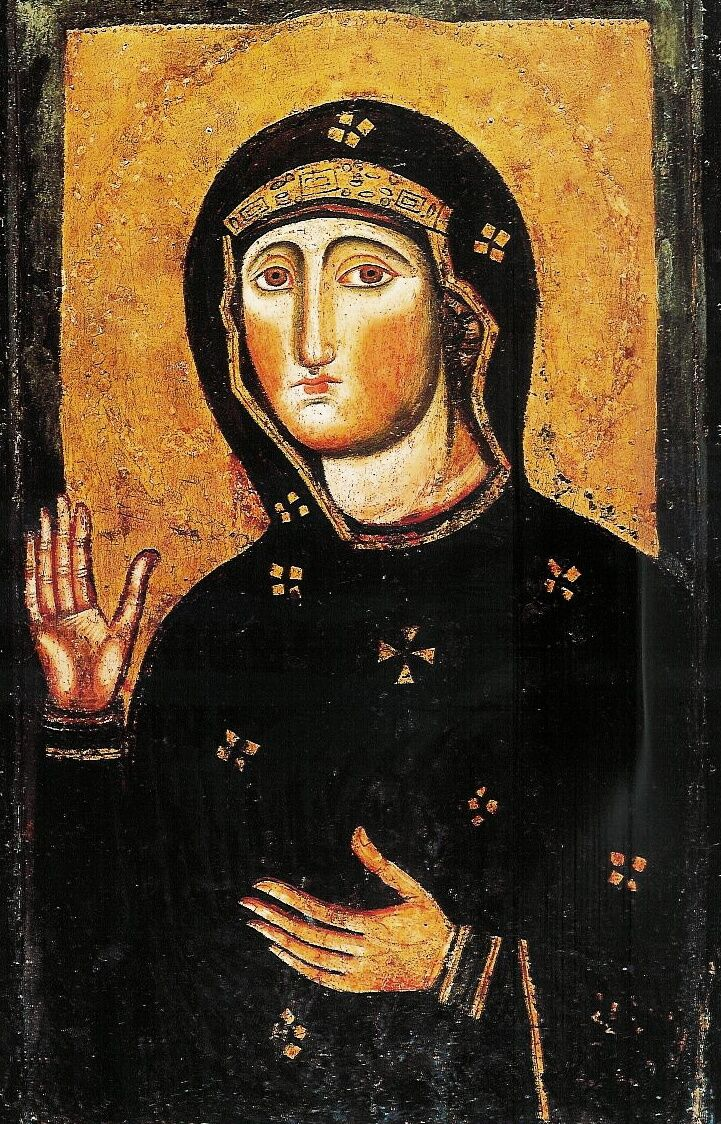
The Madonna Aracoeli, S. Maria in Ara Coeli, 11th/12th c.

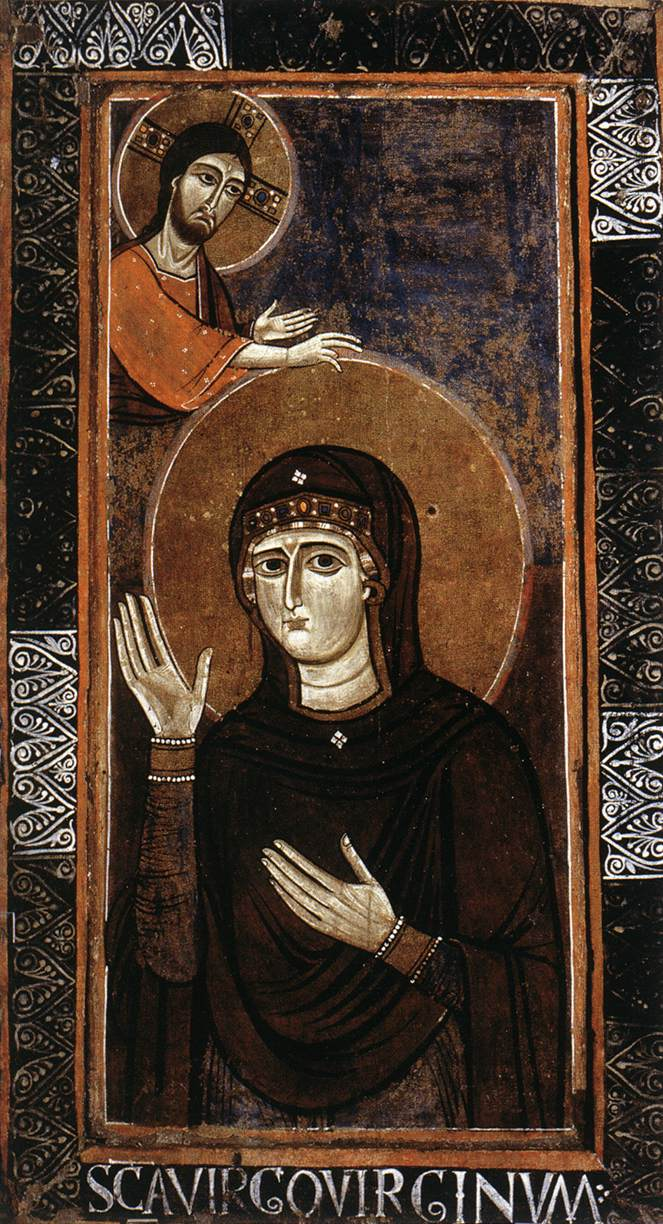
Galleria Nazionale d'Arte Antica, 12th c.

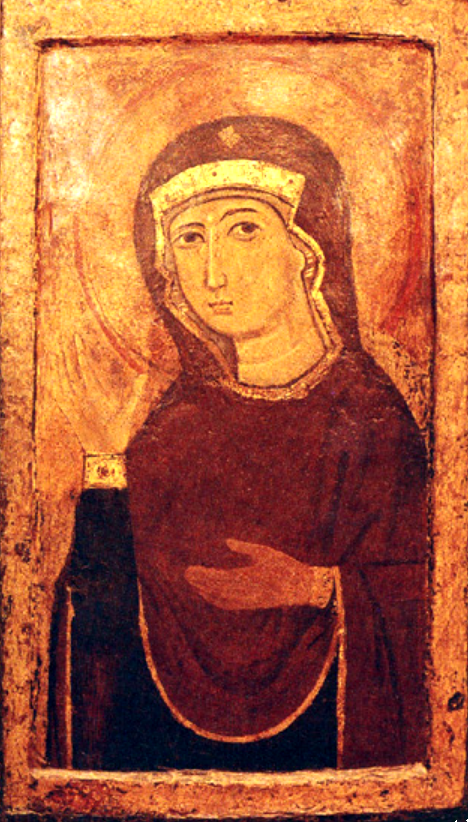
S. Maria della Concezione in Campo Marzio, 12th/13th c.

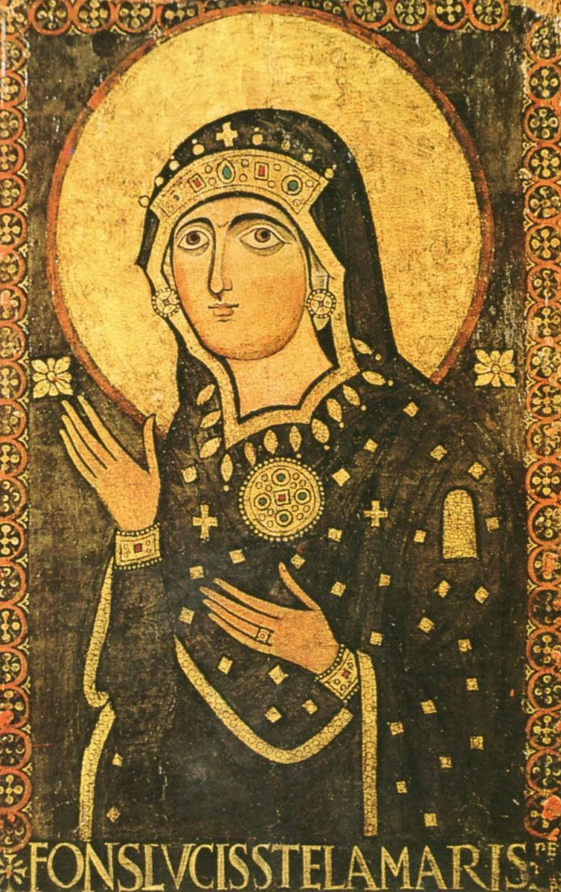
S. Maria in Via Lata, 12th/13th c.

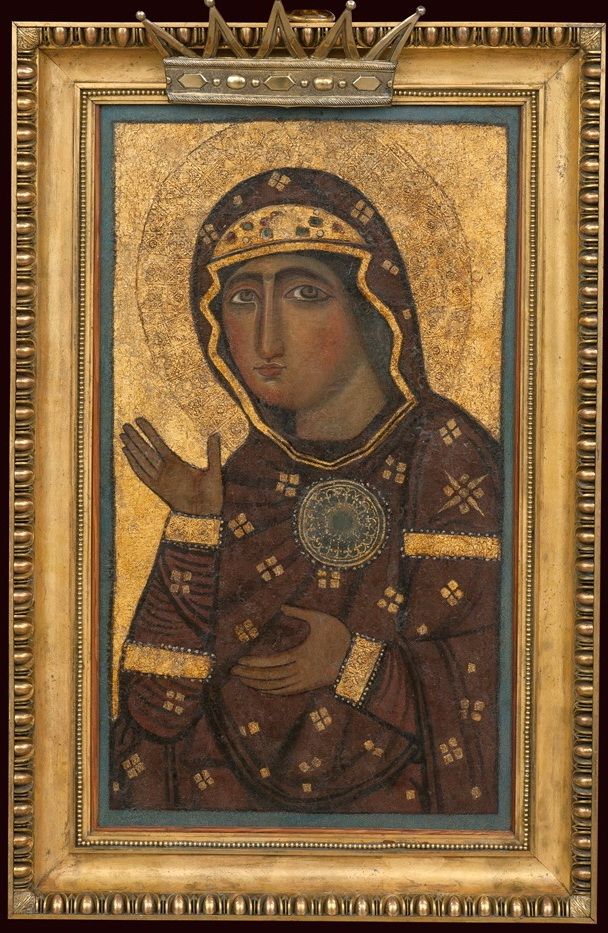
SS. Bonifacio ed Alessio, 12th/13th c.

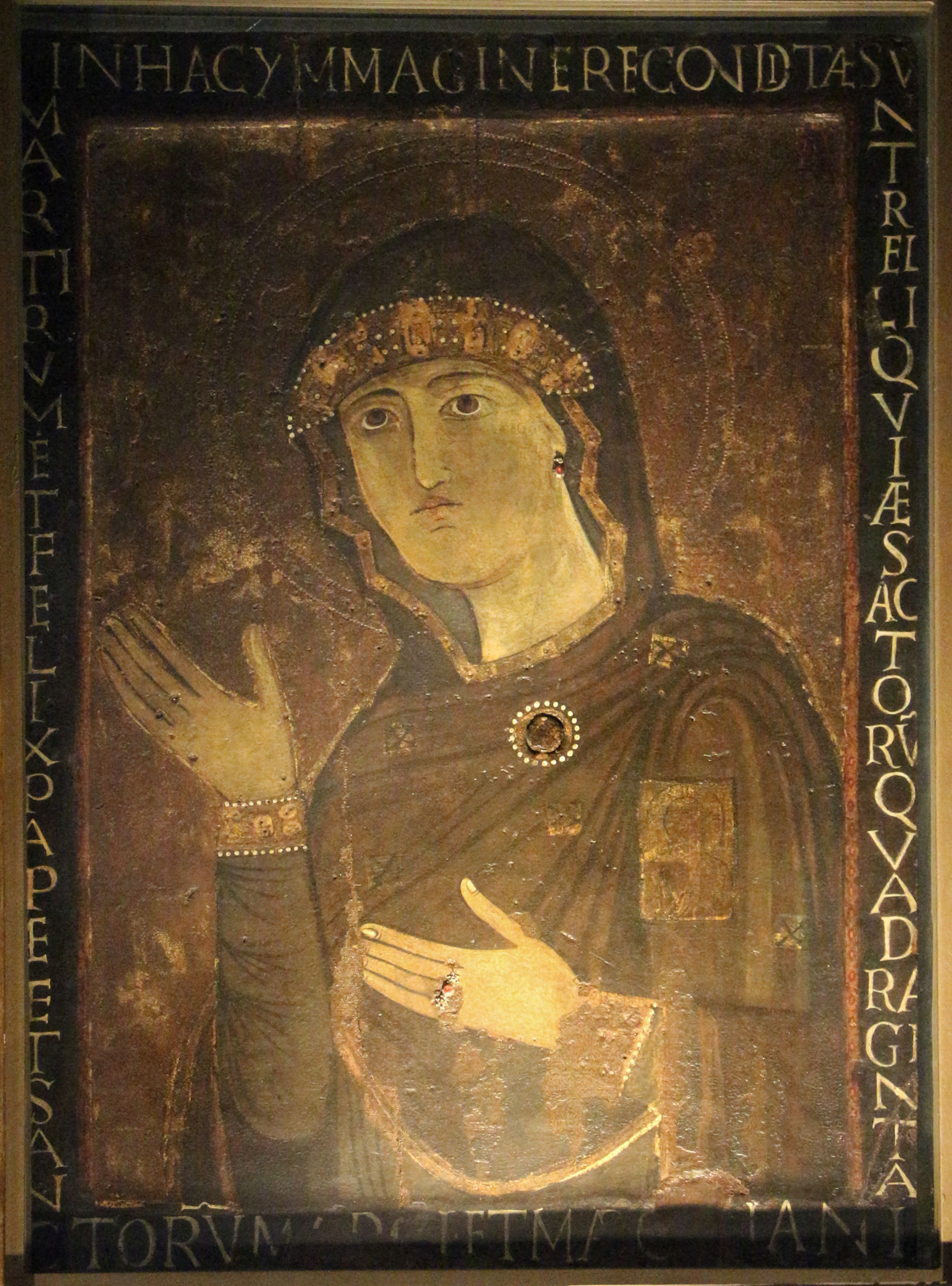
S. Lorenzo in Damaso, 12th/13th c.

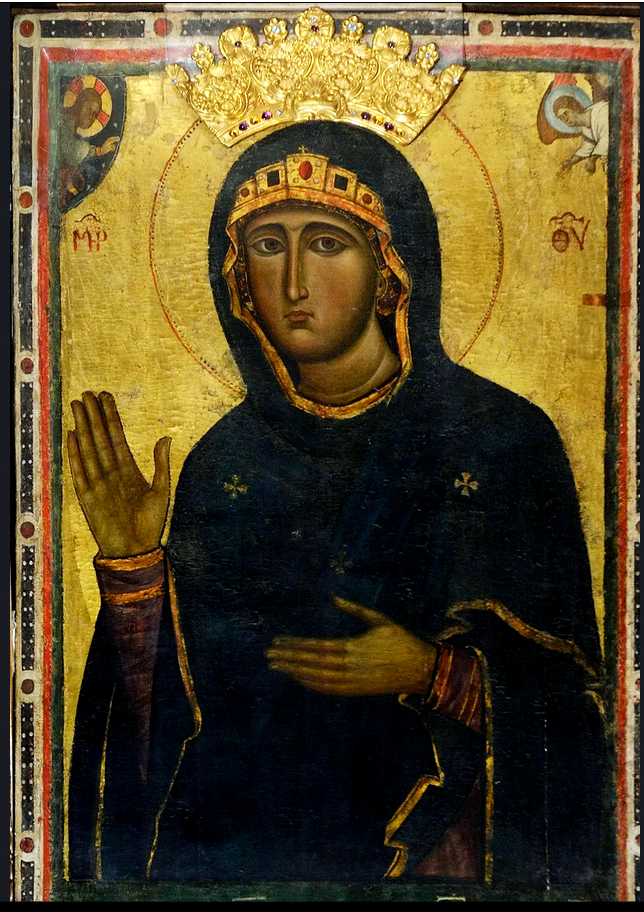
S. Maria Maggiore, Tivoli, 13th c.

== History ==
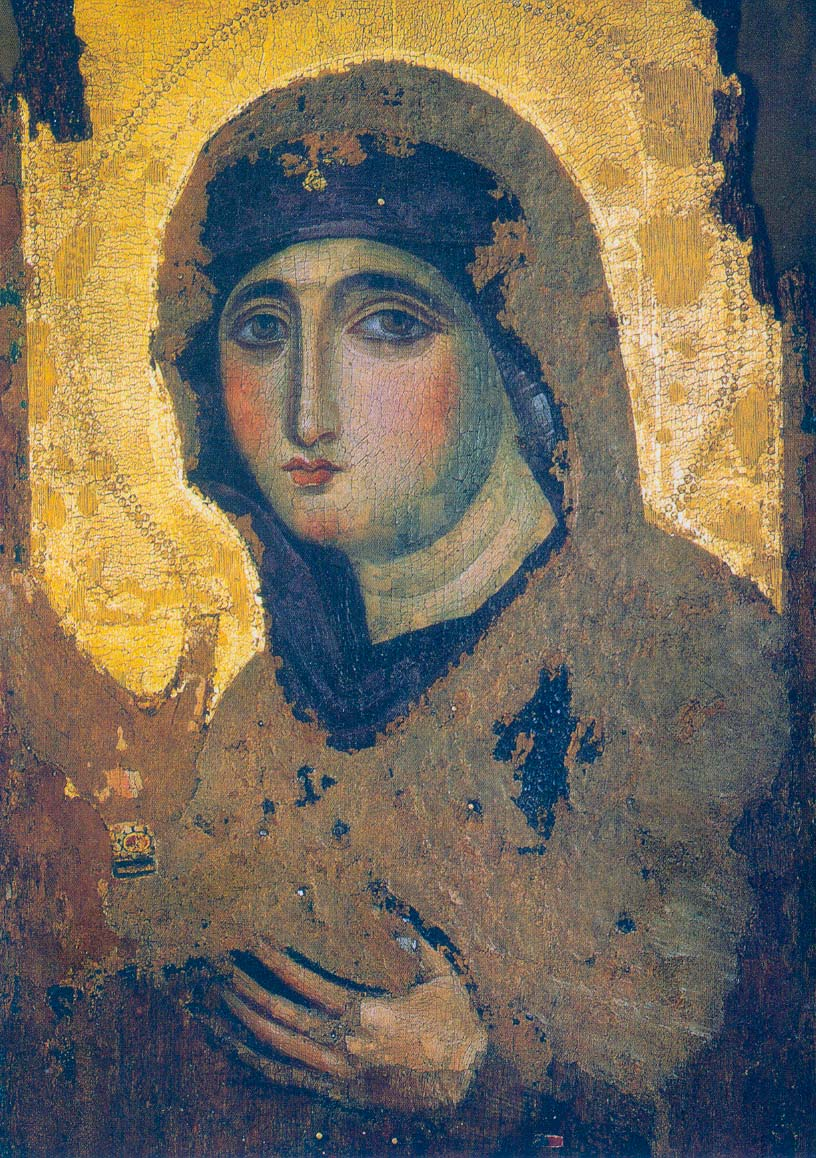
The Madonna del Rosario (detail)

The icon has been dated variously to the 1st, 5th, 6th and 7th centuries. The only thing that seems certain is that the image came from the Eastern Mediterranean, perhaps from Egypt or Syria.

According to ancient tradition, the image was brought to Rome by a pilgrim from Jerusalem or Constantinople before the first iconoclastic period (8th century). It was taken by a certain Tempulo, one of three brothers who came from Constantinople and lived in exile in Rome, and placed in the neighbouring small oratory of Sant'Agata in Turri on the old Via Appia (opposite the Baths of Caracalla). This small church was built by the Greek community living there at the end of the 6th century, and was dedicated to Saint Agatha of Catania in about 800. Through the rich endowments of Pope Sergius III, the original church and related Benedictine convent were rebuilt and consecrated to the Virgin Mary in about 900 as Santa Maria in Tempulo (Monasterium Tempuli). Apparently, Sergius tried to appropriate the icon for his cathedral on the Lateran Hill, but the image somehow returned to the convent the day after it was removed.

By 1221, the Benedictine nuns of Santa Maria in Tempulo had decided to become Dominicans and were ordered to join the newly founded Dominican convent of San Sisto Vecchio, which was located nearby, at the exit of the Via Appia. The rights and property of the monastery were transferred to the new establishment, and the famous icon was carried personally by Domingo de Guzmán (Saint Dominic), who led the sisters in a procession to their new home.

On 8 February 1575, the Dominican sisters moved from San Sisto to their new convent, Santi Domenico e Sisto, in the Piazza Magnanapoli (now the Angelicum) on the Quirinal Hill.

In 1641, the icon was Canonically crowned.

In 1931 the Dominicans moved again, to the Monastero di Santa Maria del Rosario, a convent attached to the church of that name on Monte Mario. The nuns brought the icon of Mary with them, and it remains in their care—in a small church atop Rome's steepest hill, in relative obscurity.

== Today ==
The Madonna is now kept and venerated in the part of the monastery church belonging to the cloistered church. From the part of the church which is open to the general public, through an iron grating or grille, viewers can initially only see a copy of the icon decorated with votive offerings (on the back of the original). After registration, there is the possibility to see the original before or after the weekday Mass.

Pope Benedict XVI visited the monastery on 24 June 2010 and prayed before the Advocata, as did his predecessor John Paul II on 16 November 1986.

From 13 November to 15 December 2012, the Advocata was shown for the first time outside the monastery, in the exhibition "Tavole miracolose – Le Icone medioevali di Roma e del Lazio del Fondo Edifici di Culto" in the Palazzo Venezia.

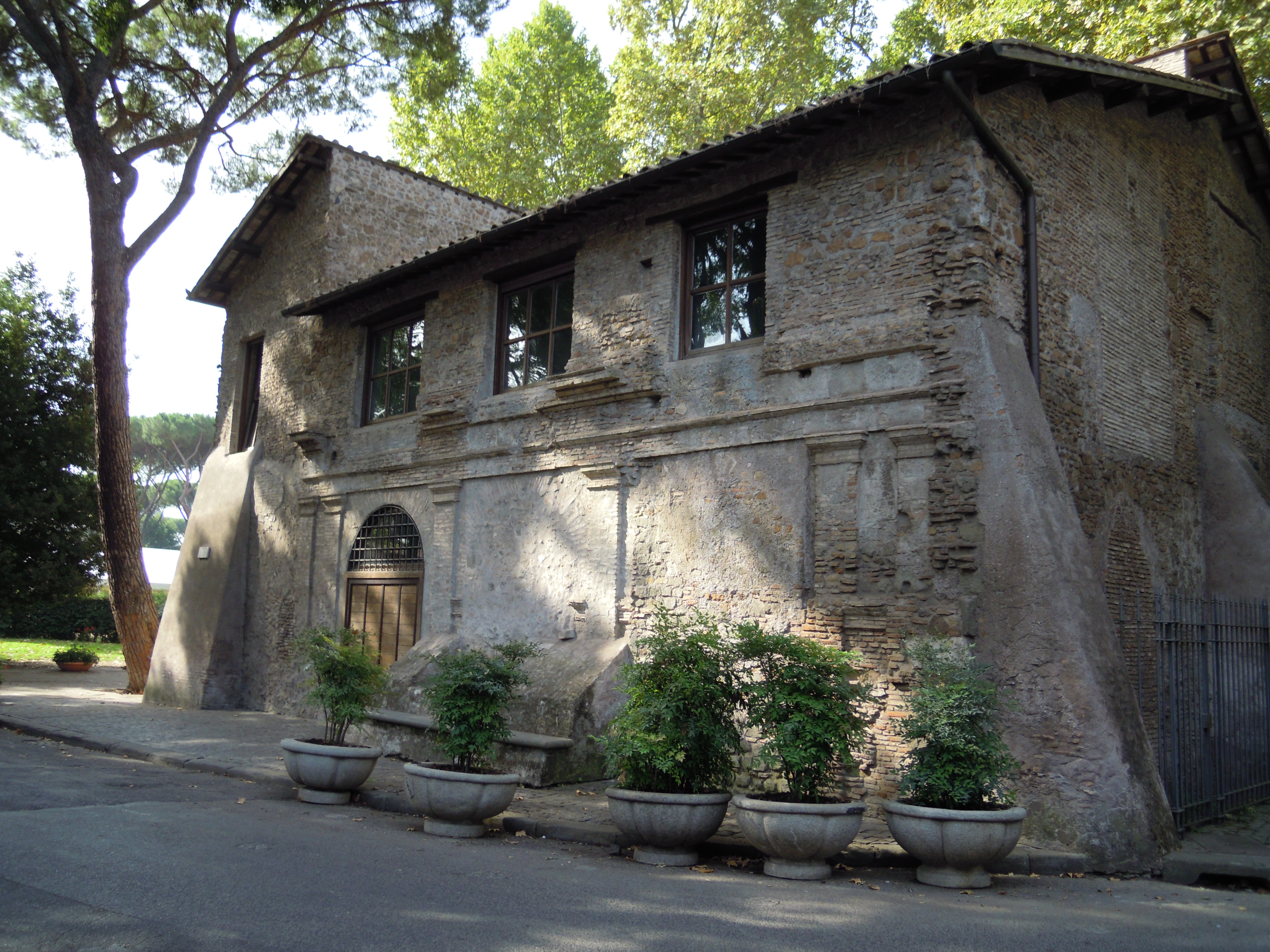
Santa Maria in Tempulo

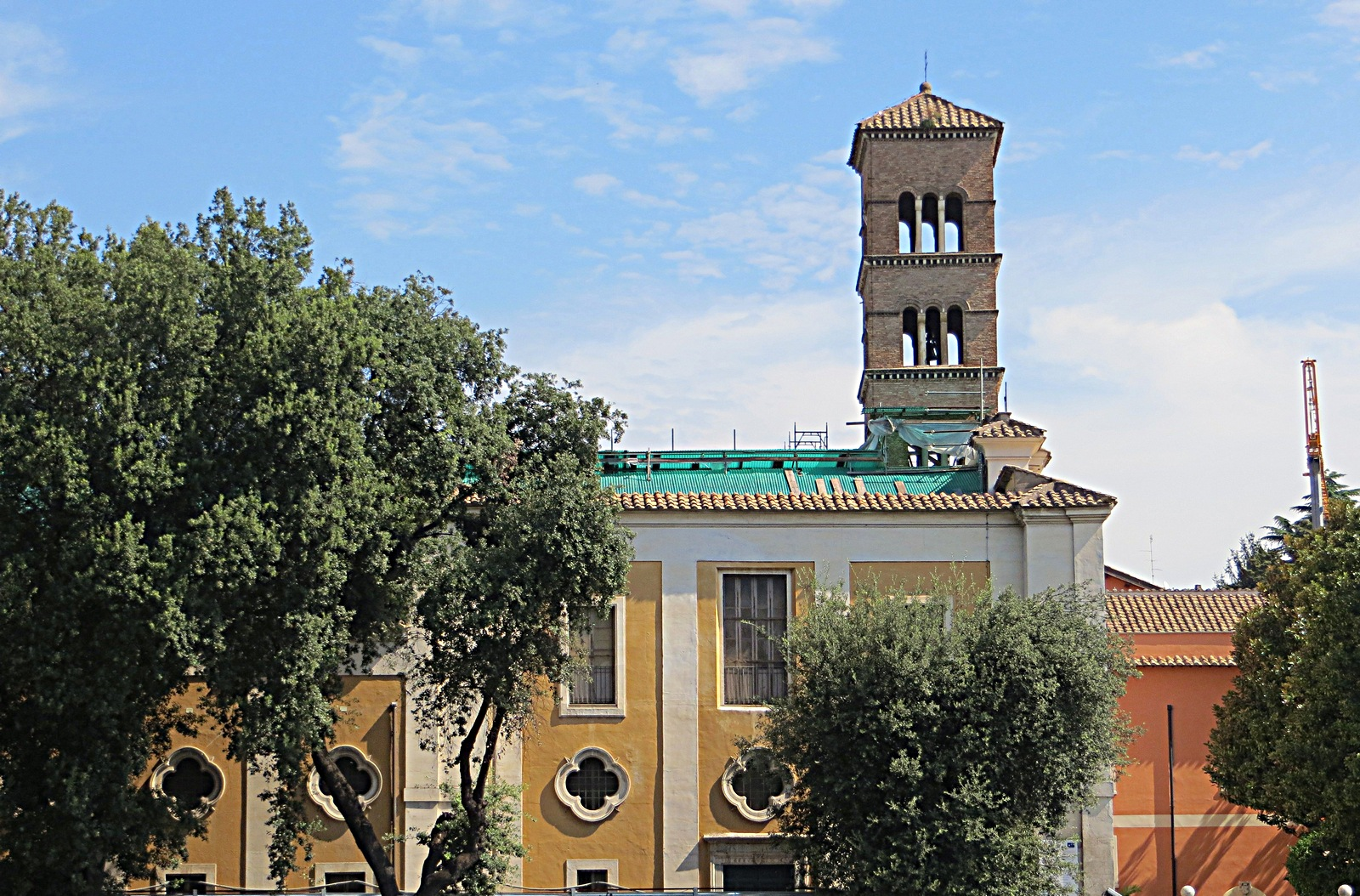
San Sisto Vecchio

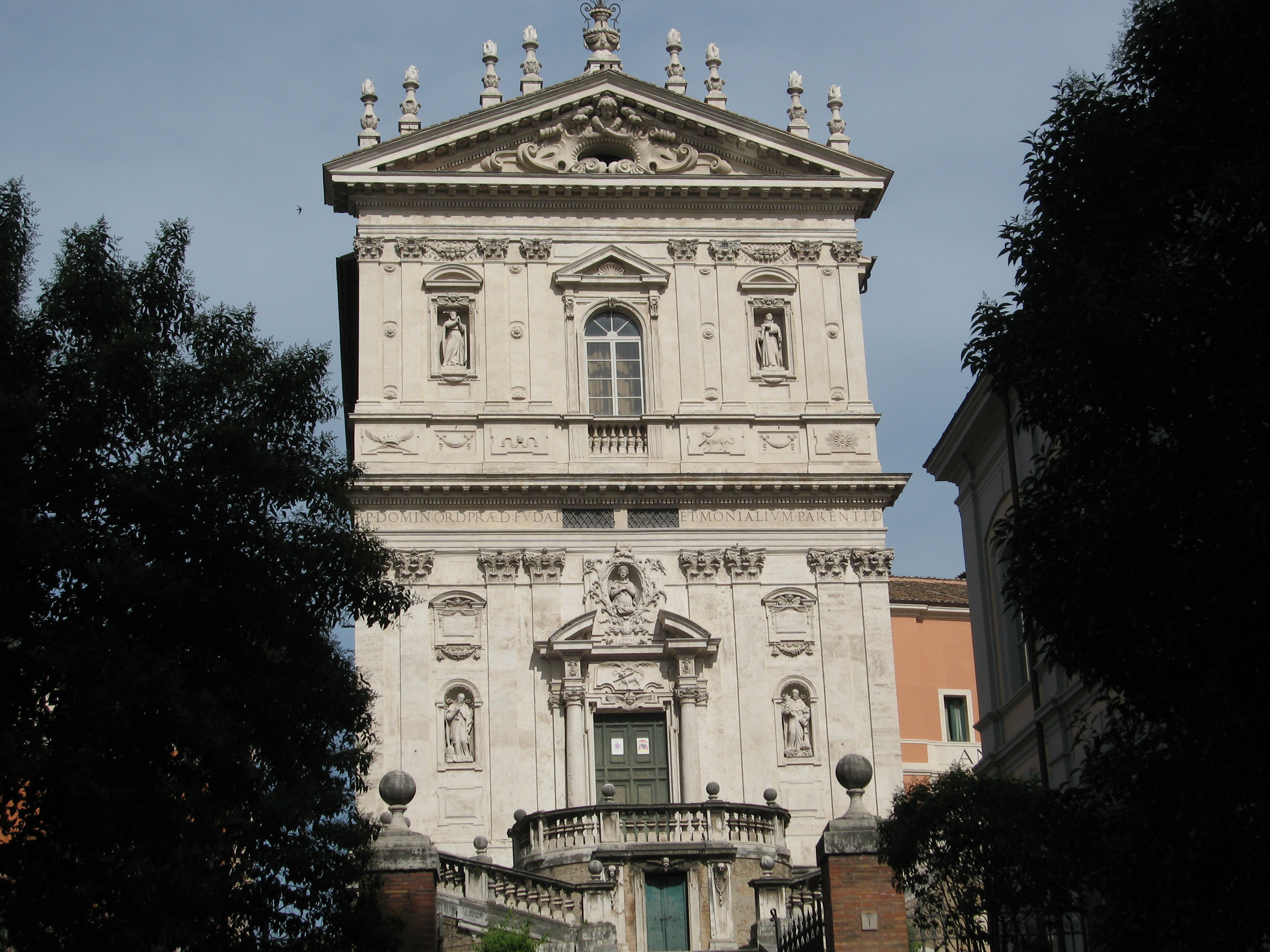
Santi Domenico e Sisto

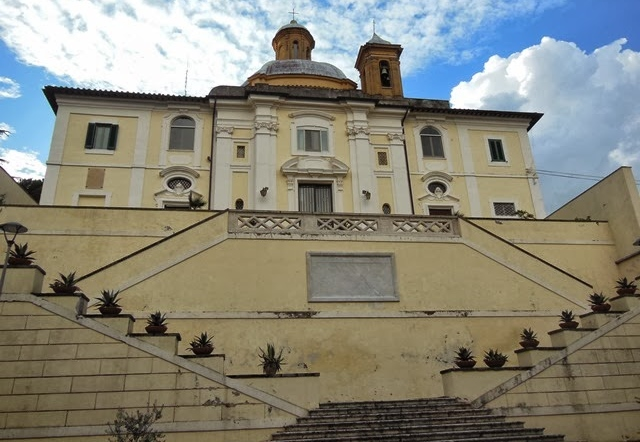
Madonna del Rosario

== Sources ==
- Badde, Paul (20 May 2010). "Roms geheimer Schatz - Die Urikone des Rosenkranzes". All About Mary. University of Dayton. Retrieved 14 October 2022. Translated in "Seeking Mary, Our Mother's Face". Illumina, Domini (28 November 2018). Retrieved 21 October 2022.
- Badde, Paul (25 November 2012). "Die Maria Advocata erobert Rom". Kath.net (Die Welt). Retrieved 14 October 2022.
- Badde, Paul (7 June 2020). "Die Advocata. Paul Badde". Katholische Mission. Video on YouTube (in German). Retrieved 14 October 2022.
- Bacci, Michele (1998). Il pennello dell'Evangelista. Storia delle immagini sacre attribuite a san Luca. Pisa: Gisem-Ets.
- Belting, Hans (1991). Bild und Kult – Eine Geschichte des Bildes vor dem Zeitalter der Kunst. Munich: C. H. Beck. pp. 47, 51, 76, 78, 83, 131, 348, 350, 353, 366, 558. Translated by Edmund Jephcott (1994) as Likeness and Presence: A History of the Image Before the Era of Art. Chicago and London: The University of Chicago Press. pp. 72, 502.
- Kraut, Gisela (1986). Lukas malt die Madonna: Zeugnisse zum künstlerischen Selbstverständnis in der Malerei. Worms: Werner. p. 10.
- Lew, Lawrence (3 October 2018). "Madonna of San Sisto: Oldest Painted Image of Mary". Diocese of Westminster. Retrieved 20 December 2022.
- Mares, Courtney (27 February 2021). "St. Dominic entrusted this Marian icon to nuns in Rome 800 years ago". Catholic News Agency (CNA). Retrieved 19 October 2022.
- Pelikan, Jaroslav (1996). Mary through the Centuries: Her Place in the History of Culture. New Haven and London: Yale University Press. p. 18.
- Spiazzi, Raimondo (1992). La chiesa e il monastero di San Sisto all'Appia: raccolta di studi storici. Bologna: Edizioni Studio Domenicano. pp. 139, 174, 292. ISBN 88-7094-124-8.
- Wehrens, Hans Georg (2016). Rom – Die christlichen Sakralbauten vom 4. bis zum 9. Jahrhundert – Ein Vademecum. Freiburg: Herder. p. 185.
- "Benedikt XVI. betet mit Dominikanerinnen auf dem Monte Mario". Radio Vatikan. 24 June 2010. Retrieved 18 October 2022.
- "La Madonna delle Grazie". Tibursuperbum. Retrieved 14 October 2022.
