= Madonna del Rosario (Rome) =

Church of Our Lady of the Rosary
- Chiesa della Madonna del Rosario
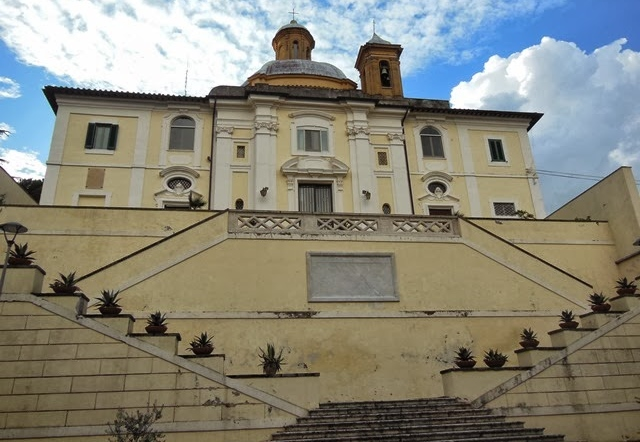
- Church of Our Lady of the Rosary
- 41.9209°N 12.4474°E
- Location: Via Alberto Cadlolo 51, Rome
- Country: Italy
- Denomination: Catholic
- Tradition: Latin Rite
- Religious order: Dominicans

History
- Dedication: Our Lady of the Rosary

Architecture
- Groundbreaking: 1628
- Completed: 1726

Administration
- Diocese: Diocese of Rome

Clergy
- Bishop: Pope Leo XIV

Madonna del Rosario is a Catholic parish church on the Via Trionfale on Monte Mario in the Quarter Della Vittoria in Rome, Italy, served by the Dominican friars.

== History ==
The church was built in 1628 by the Roman humanist Giovanni Vittorio de Rossi within the vineyard he owned on the top of Monte Mario. In 1651 it was enlarged by the friars of the Monastery of St. Onuphrius, to whom the ownership of the church had meanwhile passed; the works were commissioned to the architect Camillo Arcucci. After a period of abandonment, it was restored and enlarged again in 1726 by the architect Filippo Raguzzini, who renewed the facade and interiors. After the ruins and abandonment caused by the Napoleonic armies, the church was restored by Pope Gregory XVI, who added the double flight of stairs. The church served as a parish from 1828 to 1904, while since 1931 the annexed convent hosts a community of cloistered Dominican nuns.

The church preserves the self-portrait of the Dominican nun Anna Vittoria Dolara (1764–1827).

== Description ==
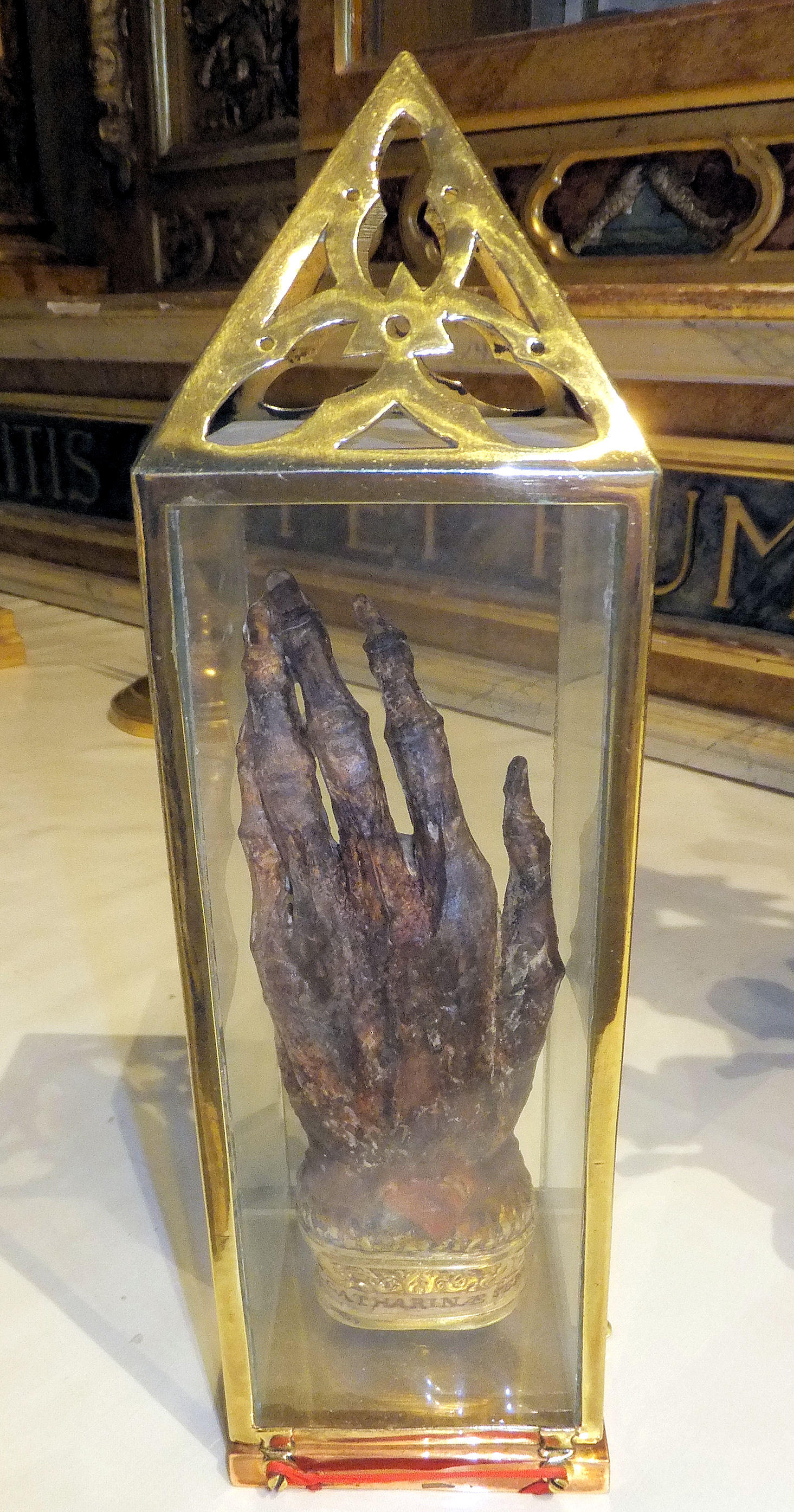
The left hand of St. Catherine of Siena

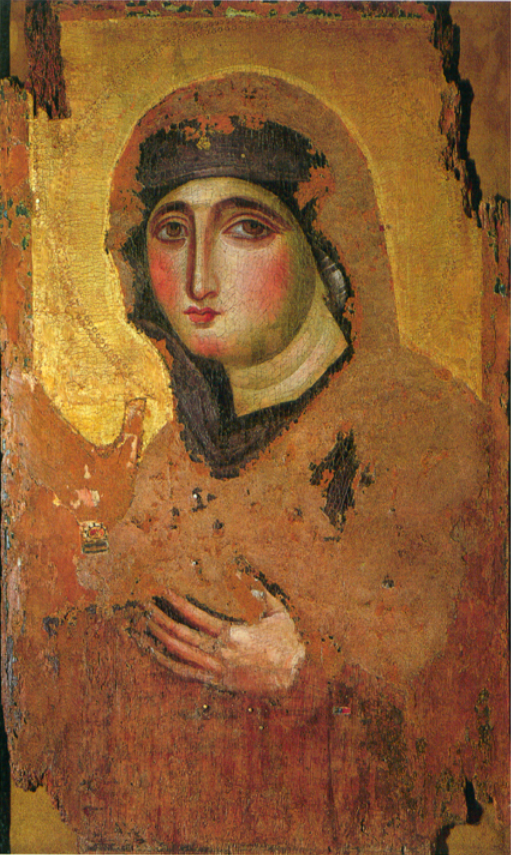
The Maria Advocata, c. 6th century, has been in the church since 1931

A double flight of stairs leads to the single-order facade, divided into three parts by ionic pilasters; a plaque recalls the stay in the convent, between 1862 and 1866, of the composer Franz Liszt. The church is surmounted by a dome and flanked by a small bell-tower.

The interior has an elliptical plan, with a high altar and two chapels on each side. At the high altar, enclosed in a niche with a stucco frame, there is the statue of the Virgin of the Rosary. The most valuable works of art preserved in the church are:

- The Virgin with the Child, a canvas by Antoniazzo Romano (15th century);
- A painting depicting St. Dominic and St. Catherine of Siena by Michelangelo Cerruti;
- The Maria Advocata, a painting on wood, a 7th–8th century Byzantine icon, associated with the legend of Saint Luke painting the Virgin; it has been documented in Rome since 1219.

The convent preserves the left hand of St. Catherine of Siena.

== Bibliography ==
- Mariano Armellini, Le chiese di Roma dal secolo IV al XIX, Rome 1891, p. 842
- C. Rendina, Le Chiese di Roma, Newton & Compton Editori, Milan 2000, p. 193–194
