= Salus Populi Romani =

Icon of the Virgin Mary

Salus Populi Romani (Protectress of the Roman peoples)
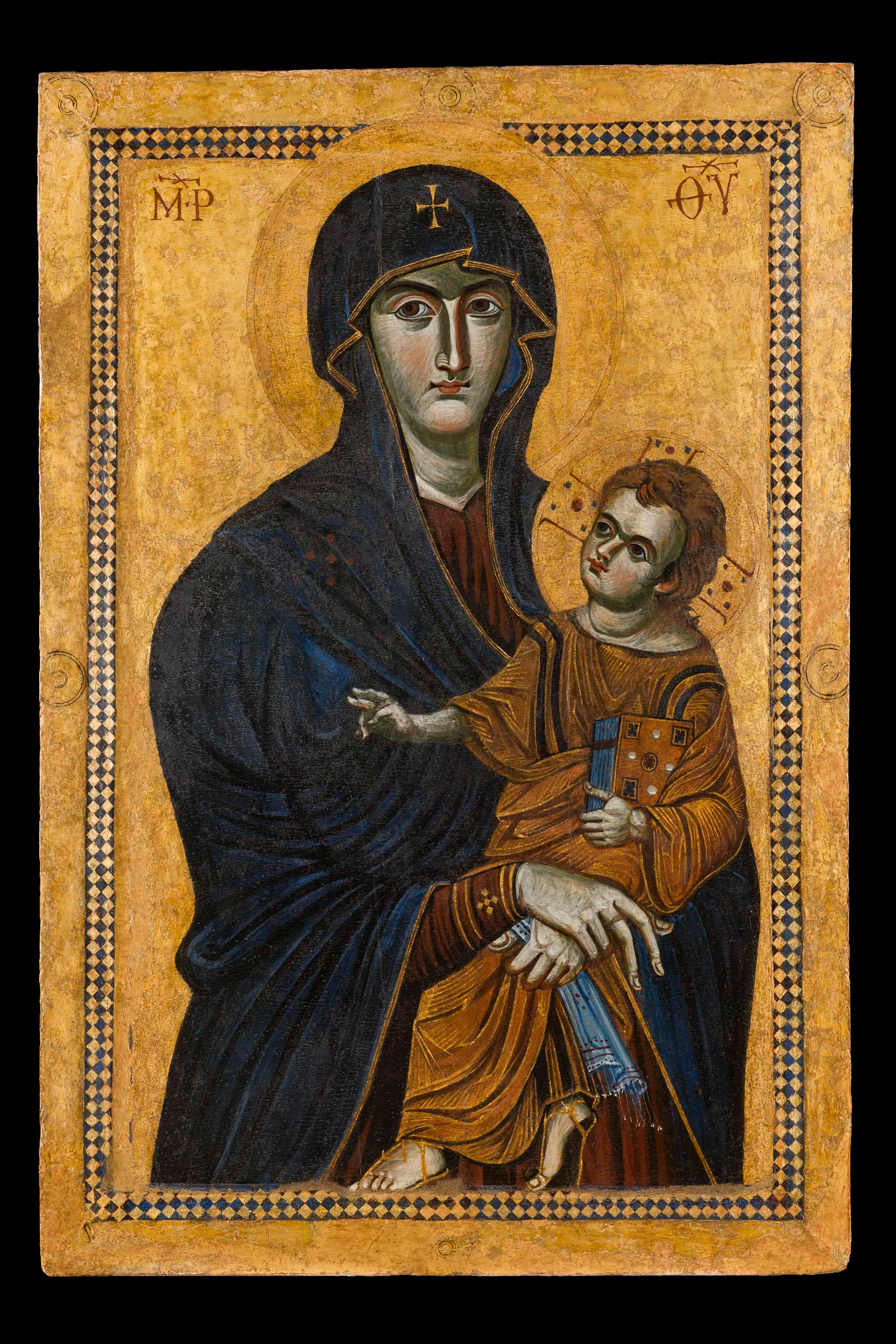
- The icon of the Salus Populi Romani after restoration (2018)
- Location: Rome
- Date: 590 A.D. (official arrival in Rome)
- Witness: Pope Gregory I
- Type: Oil Painting
- Approval: Pope Gregory XVI; Pope Pius XII
- Shrine: Pauline Chapel, Basilica of Saint Mary Major

Salus Populi Romani (English: Protectress of the Roman people, also known as the Salvific Health of the Roman people) is a Roman Catholic title associated with the venerated image of the Blessed Virgin Mary in Rome. This Byzantine icon of the Madonna and Child Jesus holding a Gospel book on a gold ground, now heavily overpainted, is kept in the Borghese (Pauline) Chapel of the Basilica of Saint Mary Major.

The image arrived in Rome in 590 A.D. during the reign of Pope Gregory I. Pope Gregory XVI granted the image a canonical coronation on 15 August 1838 through the Papal bull Cælestis Regina Maxima. Pope Pius XII crowned the image again for the secondary time and ordered a public religious procession during the Marian year of 1 November 1954. The image was cleaned and restored by the Vatican Museum, then given a Pontifical Mass on 28 January 2018.

The phrase Salus Populi Romani goes back to the legal system and polytheist rituals of the ancient Roman Republic. After the legalisation of Christianity by Emperor Constantine the Great through the Edict of Milan in 313 A.D., the phrase was sanctioned as a Marian title for the Blessed Virgin Mary.

== Historicity ==
According to the Roman historian Titus Livius, the original title originated from the imperial permission granted to the Praetorian guards to worship a goddess under a title Salus Populi Publica Romani depicted as a young woman enthroned with a serpent. This pagan cult was later abolished by Emperor Theodosius I during the Edict of Thessalonica.

The image is held to have arrived from Crete in the year 590 AD during the Pontificate of Pope Gregory the Great, who welcomed the image in person on its arrival borne with a floral boat from the Tiber river.

For centuries, the image was placed above the door to the baptistery chapel of the Basilica of Santa Maria Maggiore (considered the third of the Roman patriarchal basilicas) where in the year 1240 it began to be called Regina Caeli (English: "Queen of Heaven") in an official document. Later it was moved to the nave, and from the 13th century it was preserved in a marble church tabernacle.

In 1566, Pope Pius V put an end to certain parts of the Marian procession of the Assumption of the Virgin, due to the unruly crowds that were thought to reduce the piety of the procession, but nevertheless the portrait itself continued to have a noteworthy function in Catholicism.

Since 1613, it has been located in the altar tabernacle of the Cappella Paolina that was built specifically for it, later known to English-speaking pilgrims as the Lady Chapel. The church and its Marian shrine are under the special patronage of the popes.

From at least the 15th century, it was honored as a miraculous image, and it was later used by the Jesuit Order in particular to foster devotion to the Mother of God through the Sodality of Our Lady movement.

The image is one of the so-called "Luke images" believed to have been painted from real life by Saint Luke himself. According to the legend:

After the Crucifixion, when Our Lady moved to the home of John the Apostle, she took with her a few personal belongings – among which was a table built by the Redeemer in the workshop of Saint Joseph. When pious virgins of Jerusalem prevailed upon St. Luke to paint a portrait of the Mother of God, it was the top of this table that was used to memorialize her image. While applying his brush and paints, St. Luke listened carefully as the Mother of Jesus spoke of the life of her son, facts which the Evangelist later recorded in his Gospel. Legend also tells us that the painting remained in and around Jerusalem until it was discovered by Saint Helena in the 4th century. Together with other sacred relics, the painting was transported to Constantinople where her son, Emperor Constantine the Great, erected a church for its enthronement.

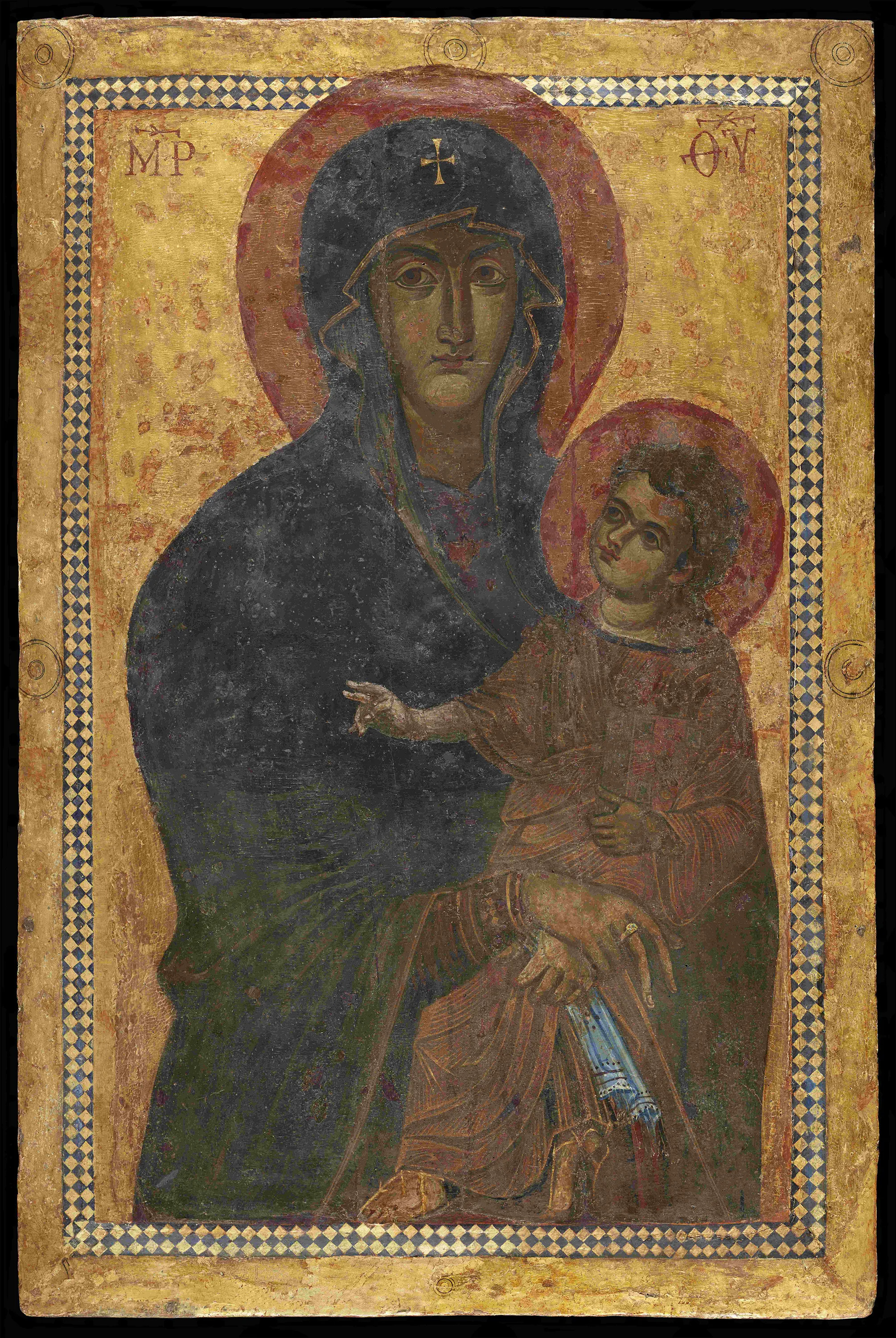
Icon Salus Populi Romani before restoration from 2018.

The Roman Breviary states:

"After the Council of Ephesus (431) in which the Mother of Jesus was acclaimed as Mother of God, Pope Sixtus III erected at Rome on the Esquiline Hill, a basilica dedicated to the honor of the Holy Mother of God. It was afterward called Saint Mary Major and it is the oldest church in the West dedicated to the honor of the Blessed Virgin Mary."

The Roman Pontifical gives the following account:

The Liberian basilica, today called Saint Mary Major, was founded by Pope Liberius (352–366) and was restored and enlarged by Sixtus III. ... Pope Liberius selected a venerated picture that hung in the pontifical oratory. It had allegedly been brought to Rome by Saint Helena...

== Description ==
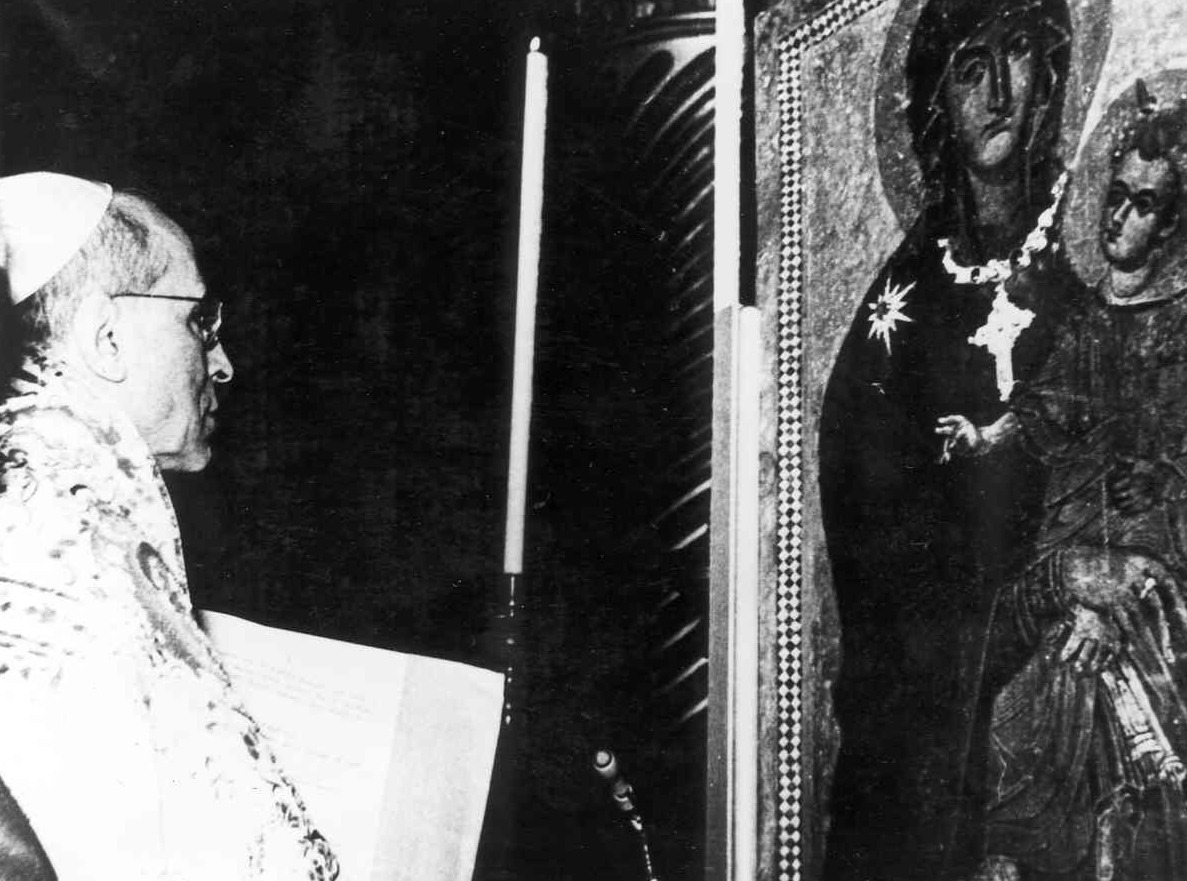
The second Canonical Coronation granted by Pope Pius XII on 1 November 1954, accompanied by a personal speech at the Basilica of Saint Peter and his Papal bull Ad Cæli Reginam.

The image is five feet high by three and a quarter feet wide (117 × 79 cm) – very large for an icon, especially one with an early date. It is painted on a thick cedar panel. Mary wears a gold-trimmed, dark blue mantle over a purple/red tunic. The letters in Greek at the top identify Mary as "Mother of God" (Μήτηρ Θεοῦ in lower case and ΜHΤHΡ ΘΕΟΥ in upper case), as is usual in Byzantine art (Christ may originally have had an inscription under later re-painting). Christ is holding a book in his left hand, presumably a Gospel Book. His right hand is raised in a blessing, and it is Mary not he who looks directly out at the viewer. The folded together position of Mary's hands distinguishes this image as a version of the earlier type from before the development of the iconography of the Hodegetria image in the 10th century, where she points to Christ with her right hand. "Rather than offering the Child, she keeps his body closer to hers and seeks physical and tactile contact with him." However the few other examples of this type do not have the Virgin's hands folded together – the right hand holds Christ's knee.

The Virgin holding in her left hand a mappa (or mappula, a sort of embroidered ceremonial handkerchief), originally a consular symbol, later an imperial one, means this image is probably one of the type showing Mary as Regina coeli or "Queen of Heaven". In addition, the Virgin also wears a plain, golden, ring band in her middle finger of her right hand, later obscured by a gemstone. The image no longer wears its Canonical crowns and jeweled regalia, which have now been transferred to the treasury of the sacristy of Saint Peter’s Basilica.

== Dating ==
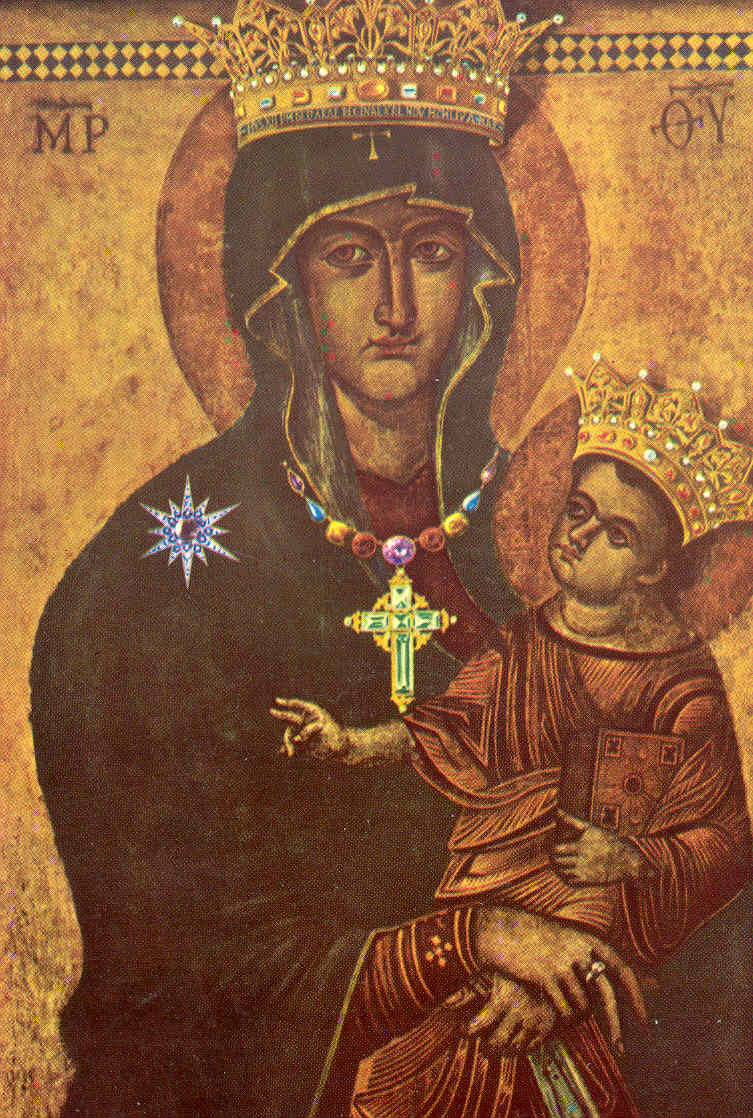
The image adorned with its Canonical crowns and jewel regalia, no longer attached today. The crowns are stored within the treasury department of Saint Peter’s Basilica.

It is agreed that the current painted surface is largely or entirely the result of medieval overpainting, and that somewhere underneath lies an older original image. The earliest version of the image "has been confidently dated to almost every possible period between the fifth century and the thirteenth". The recent full-length study by Gerhard Wolf says, cautiously, that it is "probably Late Antique" in its original form.

The icon in its current state of overpainting seems to be a work of the 13th century (as witnessed by the features of the faces), but other layers visible under the top one suggest it is a repainting of a much earlier piece; especially revealing is the modeling of Child's right hand in the first layer, which can be compared to other early Christian icons that display 'Pompeian' illusionistic qualities. The areas of linear stylization, such as Christ's garment which is rendered in golden hatching producing a flat effect, seem to go back to the 8th century, and can be compared with a very early icon of Elijah from Mount Sinai. A second restoration process started around 1100 and came to an end in the 13th century. The Virgin's blue mantle which is wrapped over her purple dress was severely altered in the outline; the red halos are also not part of the original image.

The image type itself suggests it is not a medieval invention, but rather an Early Christian concept dating from antiquity: a majestic, half-length portrait showing a frank outward gaze of the ruler-like Virgin, with her upright, stately pose and folded hands gently clasping the Child, unique among all icons. Lively turning of the maturely developed and attired Child also attests to the painting's antiquity. The vivid contrapposto of the two bodies, which suggests direct observation, can be compared with a 5th-century Mount Sinai icon of the Virgin and Child in Kiev, and contrasted with the Pantheon Marian icon from 609, which already shows the Mother slightly subordinated to the Child by the imploring gesture and the turn of the head, and where the interaction of the bodies exists only in a flat plane. These comparisons suggest a date of the 7th century for the icon.

The early fame of the icon can be gauged from the production of replicas (a fresco in Santa Maria Antiqua seems to have reproduced it already in the 8th century), and the role it played in the ritual on the feast of the Virgin's Assumption, where the Acheiropoieta (the panel painting of Christ from the Lateran Basilica) was moved in a procession to Santa Maria Maggiore to 'meet' with it. Ugo Monneret de Villard showed that engravings of this icon brought by Jesuits to Ethiopia influenced the art of that country from the 17th century onwards, repeating "every detail of her own and the Child's posture, the position of the hands being especially characteristic." More far flung apparent copies include a Moghul miniature, presumably based on a copy given to Akbar by the Jesuits, and copies in China, of which a 16th-century example is in the Field Museum of Natural History in Chicago.

== Pontifical approbations ==
The image has been venerated by several Popes and acted as a Roman Catholic Mariological symbol for the city of Rome and its people.

- Pope Gregory I in 593 had the icon carried throughout Rome during the Easter festivals and prayed for an end to a plague at that time.
- Pope Pius V in 1571 to pray for victory at the Battle of Lepanto
- Pope Gregory XVI granted a decree of Pontifical coronation to the image in 15 August 1838 via Apostolic Letter titled Cælestis Regina Maxima in thanksgiving for the conclusion of the cholera pandemic in 1837.
- Pope Pius XII honored the image in the following occasions:
  - Celebrated his first Catholic Mass at the Borghese chapel of the icon on Easter Sunday, 2 April 1899.
  - Issued a second pontifical decree of coronation to the image on 11 October 1954. He later carried out the rite of coronation in person without a proxy on 1 November 1954, and ordered the image into Saint Peters Basilica to accompany his personal speech and the papal encyclical Ad Cæli Reginam, which also established the feast of the Queenship of the Blessed Virgin Mary.
- Pope John Paul II highlighted its iconography during the World Youth Day for the Jubilee Year of 2000.
- Pope Benedict XVI also venerated the image on various occasions under that specific Marian title.
- Pope Francis restored the image and gave a pontifical Mass on 28 January 2018 on the anniversary of the icon's translation at the current shrine. In 2020 Francis presented the icon in St. Peter's Square during an extraordinary Urbi et Orbi blessing, held in response to the COVID-19 pandemic. During his 12-year pontificate, the Pope visited the icon 126 times. Francis is the ninth Pontiff buried within the shrine, and first to be buried outside Vatican City since 1903.

== Restoration ==
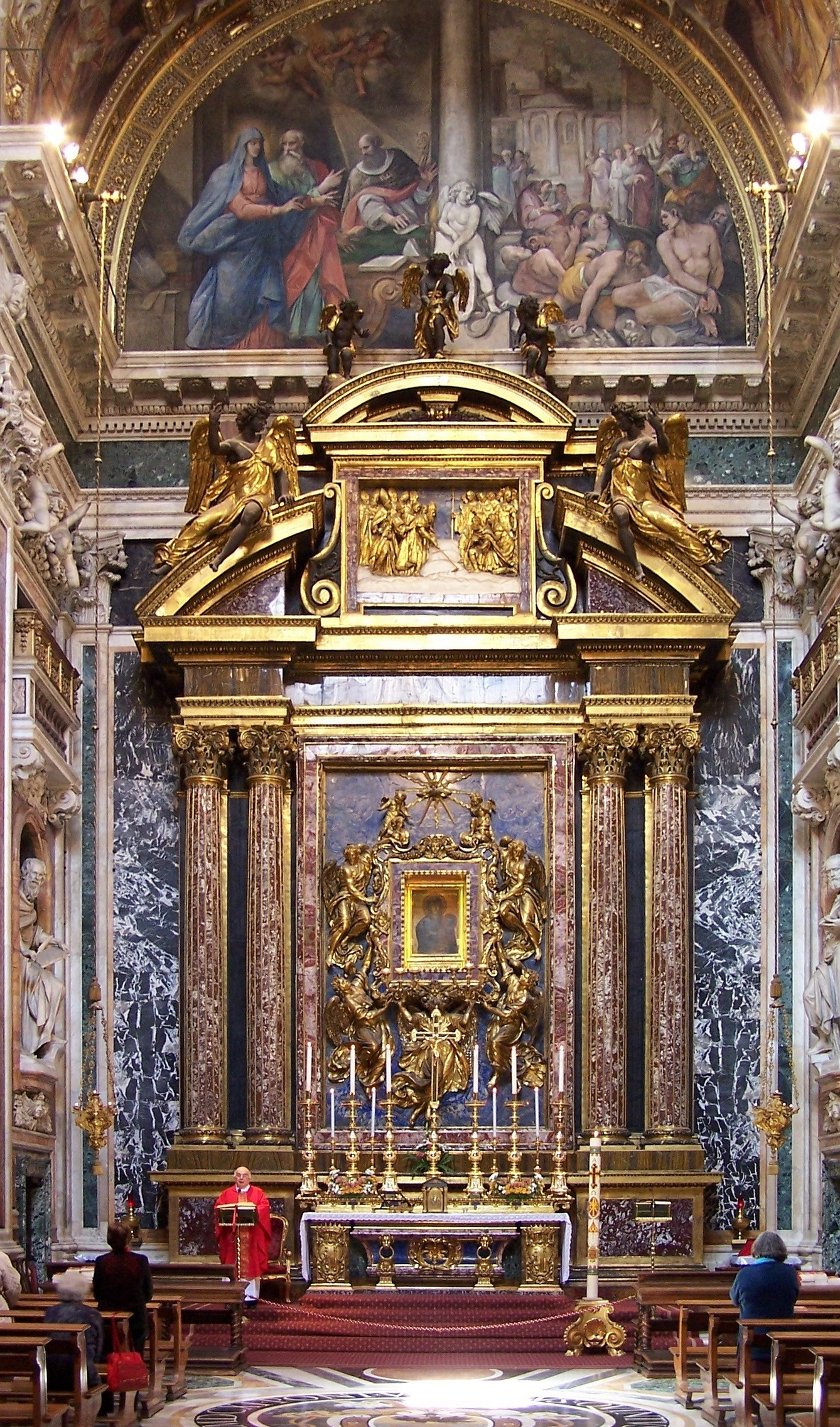
The Borghese Chapel of the icon.

In 2017, the Vatican Museum was tasked with the full restoration and conservation process of the venerated image. The restoration process included the following conservations:

- Refilling of insect holes and various damage to the image, to the mantle, faces and background.
- The restoration of its golden halo, from the corroded red lacquer (oxidized).
- The brightening of the faces of the image, re-highlighting its facial structures.
- The repainting of the hands and forehead cross, once obscured by gemstones and various ornaments.
- The restoration of the mantle to its indigo blue paint and its diagonal checkered border.
- The varnishing of the back of the image, strengthening its original frame.

The process was completed within a year and was given the honor of a Pontifical Mass by Pope Francis on 28 January 2018, on the anniversary of the translation of the icon to its new permanent shrine.

== In the Schœnstatt Movement ==
Salus Populi Romani is also said to be the source of the title Mater ter Admirabilis (Mother Thrice Admirable) used for the Blessed Virgin Mary within the Schoenstatt Marian Movement.

Salus Populi Romani was the centerpiece of the Colloquium Marianum in Ingolstadt, in 1604. According to the Schoenstatt, on 6 April 1604, Father Jakob Rem, SJ, desired to know which of the invocations from the Litany of Loreto would please the Virgin Mary the most. He reported that after meditation and looking at the image of Salus Populi Romani, the title Mother Thrice Admirable was revealed to him.

The title Mother Thrice Admirable has since become part of the Schoenstatt Movement and is also associated with another well known Madonna, namely the 1898 Refugium Peccatorum Madonna by the Italian artist Luigi Crosio which was purchased by the Schoenstatt Sisters in Switzerland in 1964 and has since been called the Mother Thrice Admirable Madonna.

== See also ==
- Madonna della Clemenza
- Maria Advocata (Madonna del Rosario)
- Our Lady of Šiluva
