= Santi Bonifacio ed Alessio =

Roman Catholic basilica in Rome, Italy

- Basilica of Saints Boniface and Alexius on the Aventine Hill
- Sant'Alessio all'Aventino
- Basilica dei Santi Bonifacio e Alessio
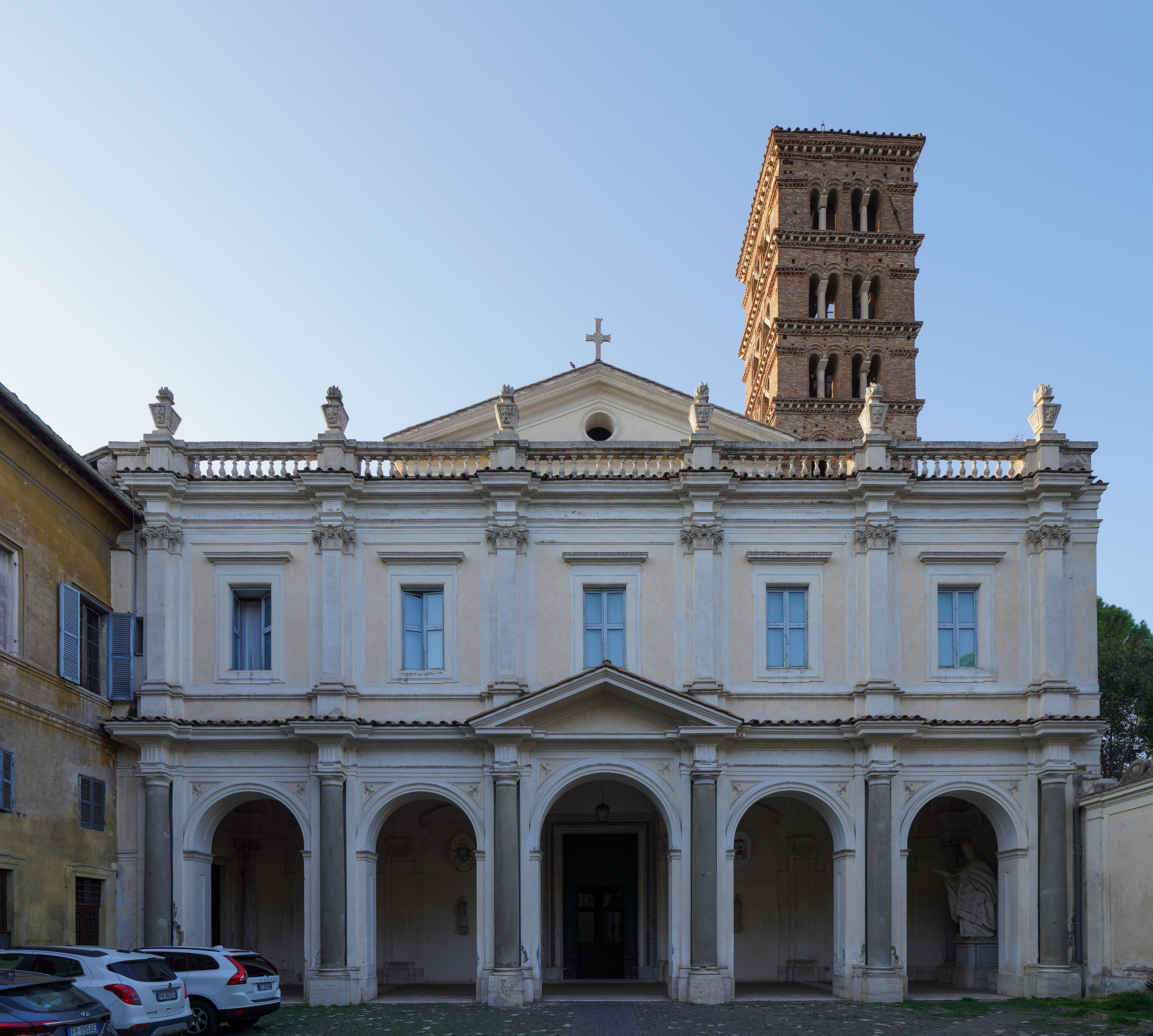
- Exterior
- Click on the map for a fullscreen view
- 41°53′01″N 12°28′44″E
- Location: Piazza Sant’Alessio 23, Rome
- Country: Italy
- Language: Italian
- Denomination: Catholic
- Tradition: Roman Rite
- Religious order: Somaschi Fathers
- Website: santalessiocrs.it

History
- Status: titular church, minor basilica
- Founded: 4th century
- Dedication: Boniface of Tarsus and Alexius of Rome

Architecture
- Architect(s): Giambattista Nolli, Tommaso De Marchis
- Architectural type: Baroque, Romanesque

Administration
- Diocese: Rome

The Basilica dei Santi Bonifacio e(d) Alessio is a basilica, rectory church served by the Somaschans, and titular church for a cardinal-priest on the Aventine Hill in the third prefecture of central Rome, Italy.

It is dedicated to Saint Boniface of Tarsus and Saint Alexius, the former the original and the latter added in the 10th century. It lies on Piazza Sant’Alessio 23, near the historical gardens of St. Alexius and Via di santa Sabina.

== Basilica ==
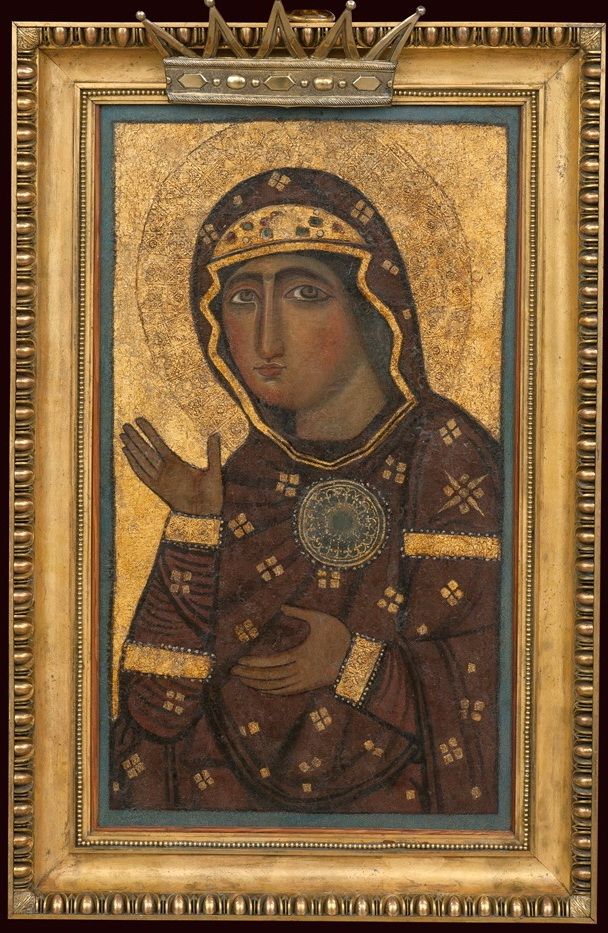
Icon of Madonna di Sant’ Alessio (Madonna of St. Alexis; Madonna of Intercession)

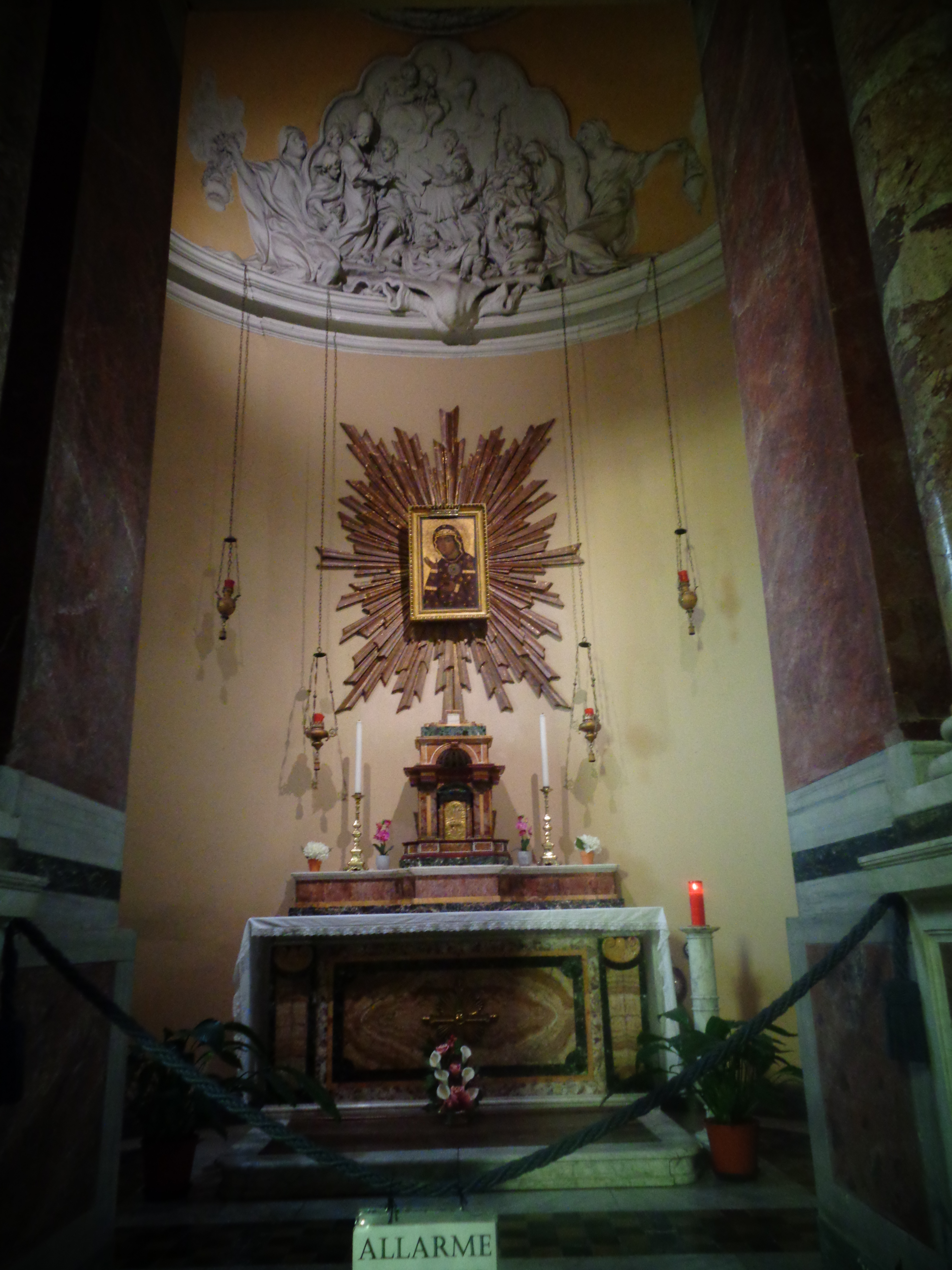
The Chapel of the Most Holy Sacrament and Madonna di Sant'Alessio in Basilica of the Saints Bonifacio and Alexis

Founded between the 3rd and 4th centuries, it was restored in 1216 by Pope Honorius III (some columns of his building survive in the present building's eastern apse); in 1582; in 1743 designed by Giovanni Battista Nolli and in the 1750s reelaborated by Tommaso De Marchis (his main altar survives); and between 1852 and 1860 by the Somaschi Fathers, who still serve it as a rectory church. The 16th century style façade, elaborated from the De Marchis phase, is built onto the medieval-style quadriportico.

The church has a Romanesque campanile. On the south side of the nave is the funerary monument Eleonora Boncompagni Borghese of 1693, to a design of Giovan Contini Batiste, and in the south transept the Chapel of Charles IV of Spain, with the icon Madonna di sant'Alessio, an Edessa icon of the Intercession of the Madonna dating from the 12-13th centuries, thought to have been painted by St Luke the Evangelist and brought from the East by St Alexius. The church also contains the tombstone of Peter Savelli (of the same family as Pope Honorius III).

In a Romanesque crypt that survives below the church, the main altar contains relics of St Thomas of Canterbury. The crypt's 12th-century wall of frescoes depicts the Agnus Dei and symbols of the Four Evangelists, and on the north aisle St Gerolamo Emiliani introducing orphans to the Virgin by Jean Francois De Troy, and at the end of the aisle The Holy Steps and the titular church of Saint Alexius in wood and stucco by Andrea Bergondi.

Connected to the basilica are the buildings of the former Benedictine monastery, which accepted the Camaldolese reforms of St. Romuald in the 10th century. The buildings now belong to the Italian state.

In 2015, and again on 29 June 2019, the discovery of a medieval fresco in an exceptional state of preservation and integrity was noticed by the Italian press. The painting has been restored and its subject has been identified by the Italian art historian Claudia Viggiani with Christ the Pilgrim. The fresco was firstly discovered in 1965 by the Italian Genio Civile during the stabilization's works of the bell tower, and then discarded for forty years, until 2005.

=== Burials ===
- Giovanni Vincenzo Gonzaga

== Cardinal title ==
The basilica has been a titular church for Cardinal-priests (the second order) from 1587, originally called Sant'Alessio.

In the 19th century, the former dedication of the basilica was renewed, and from that time on the official name of the basilica and the cardinal titulus are Santi Bonifacio e(d) Alessio.

=== Cardinal-protectors ===
(All Italian unless specified)

- Giovanni Vincenzo Gonzaga (1587–1591)
- Ottavio Paravicini (1592–1611)
- Metello Bichi (1611–1619)
- Roberto Ubaldini (1621–1629)
- Giovanni Francesco Guidi di Bagno (1629–1641)
- Mario Theodoli (1641–1649)
- Luigi Omodei (1652–1676)
- vacant (1676–1681)
- Federico Visconti (1681–1693)
- Taddeo Luigi del Verme (1696–1717)
- Giberto Borromeo (1717–1740)
- Carlo Gaetano Stampa (1740–1742)
- vacant (1742–1753)
- Antonio Andrea Galli (1753–1757)
- Giuseppe Maria Castelli (1759–1780)
- Paolo Francesco Antamori (1781–1795)
- vacant (1795–1801)
- Giovanni Filippo Gallarati Scotti (1801–1814)
- Emmanuele de Gregorio (1816–1829); in commendam (1829–1839)
- vacant (1839–1843)
- Francesco di Paola Villadecani (1843–1861)
- (French) Alexis Billiet (1862–1873)
- (Austrian) Johannes Baptist Franzelin, Jesuit (S.J.) (1876–1886)
- Giuseppe d' Annibale (1889–1892)
- Angelo Di Pietro (1893–1903)
- (Spanish) Sebastián Herrero y Espinosa de los Monteros, C.O. (1903)
- (Brazilian) Joaquim Arcoverde de Albuquerque Cavalcanti (1905–1930)
- (Brazilian) Sebastião Leme da Silveira Cintra (1933–1942)
- (Brazilian) Jaime de Barros Câmara (1946–1971)
- (Brazilian) Avelar Brandão Vilela (1973–1986)
- (Brazilian) Lucas Moreira Neves, Dominican Order (O.P.) (1988–1998); in commendam (1998–2002)
- (Brazilian) Eusébio Oscar Scheid, Dehonian (S.C.J.) (2003–2021)
- (Brazilian) Paulo Cezar Costa (2022-present)

Preceded by San Bartolomeo all'Isola	Landmarks of Rome; Santi Bonifacio ed Alessio	Succeeded by San Camillo de Lellis
