= 1443 =

1443 in various calendars
- Gregorian calendar: 1443; MCDXLIII
- Ab urbe condita: 2196
- Armenian calendar: 892; ԹՎ ՊՂԲ
- Assyrian calendar: 6193
- Balinese saka calendar: 1364–1365
- Bengali calendar: 849–850
- Berber calendar: 2393
- English Regnal year: 21 Hen. 6 – 22 Hen. 6
- Buddhist calendar: 1987
- Burmese calendar: 805
- Byzantine calendar: 6951–6952
- Chinese calendar: 壬戌年 (Water Dog); 4140 or 3933 — to — 癸亥年 (Water Pig); 4141 or 3934
- Coptic calendar: 1159–1160
- Discordian calendar: 2609
- Ethiopian calendar: 1435–1436
- Hebrew calendar: 5203–5204
- Hindu calendars
- Vikram Samvat: 1499–1500
- Shaka Samvat: 1364–1365
- Kali Yuga: 4543–4544
- Holocene calendar: 11443
- Igbo calendar: 443–444
- Iranian calendar: 821–822
- Islamic calendar: 846–847
- Japanese calendar: Kakitsu 3 (嘉吉３年)
- Javanese calendar: 1358–1359
- Julian calendar: 1443; MCDXLIII
- Korean calendar: 3776
- Minguo calendar: 469 before ROC 民前469年
- Nanakshahi calendar: −25
- Thai solar calendar: 1985–1986
- Tibetan calendar: ཆུ་ཕོ་ཁྱི་ལོ་ (male Water-Dog); 1569 or 1188 or 416 — to — ཆུ་མོ་ཕག་ལོ་ (female Water-Boar); 1570 or 1189 or 417

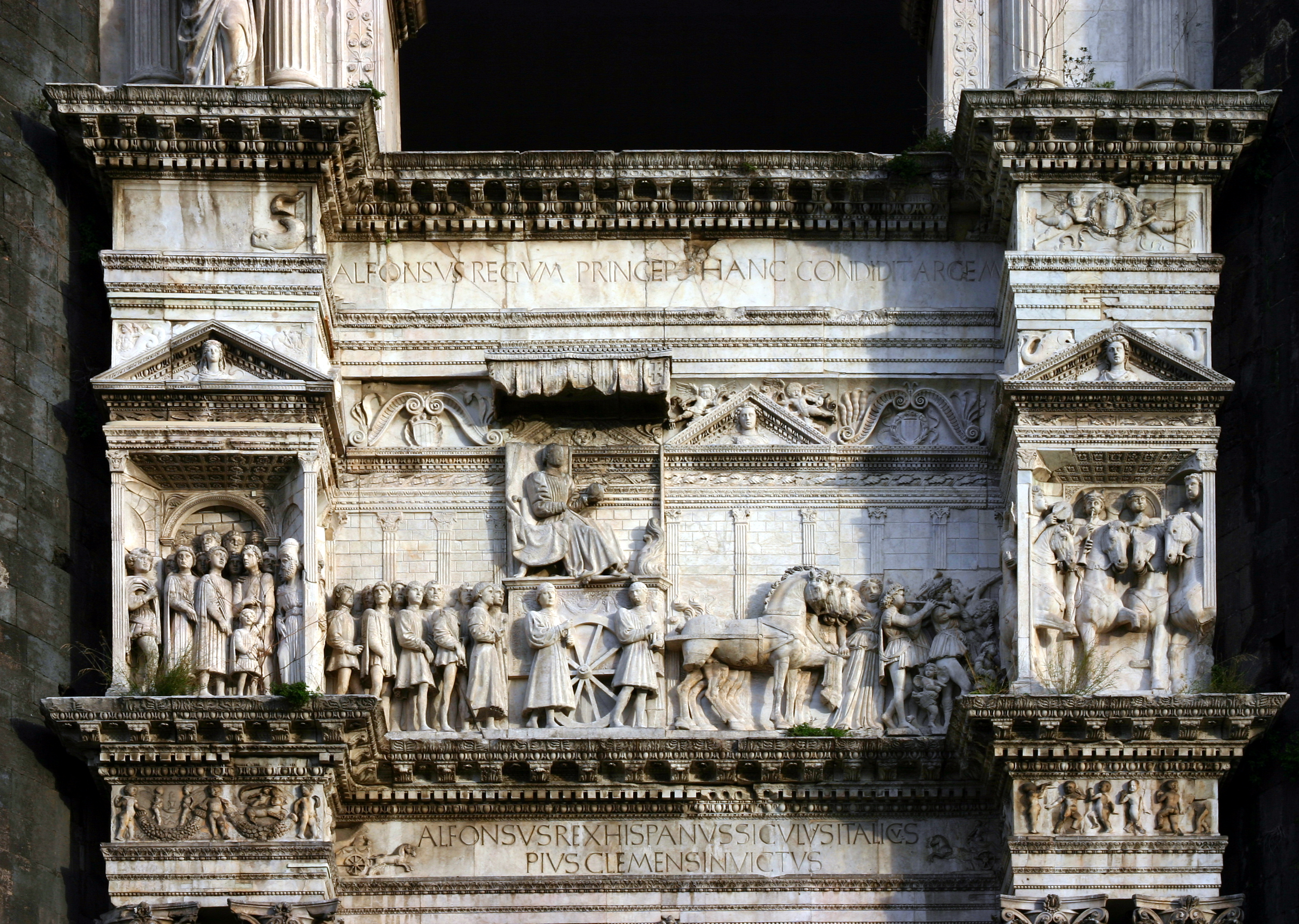
February 26: Alfonso V of Aragon makes triumhant entry into Naples.

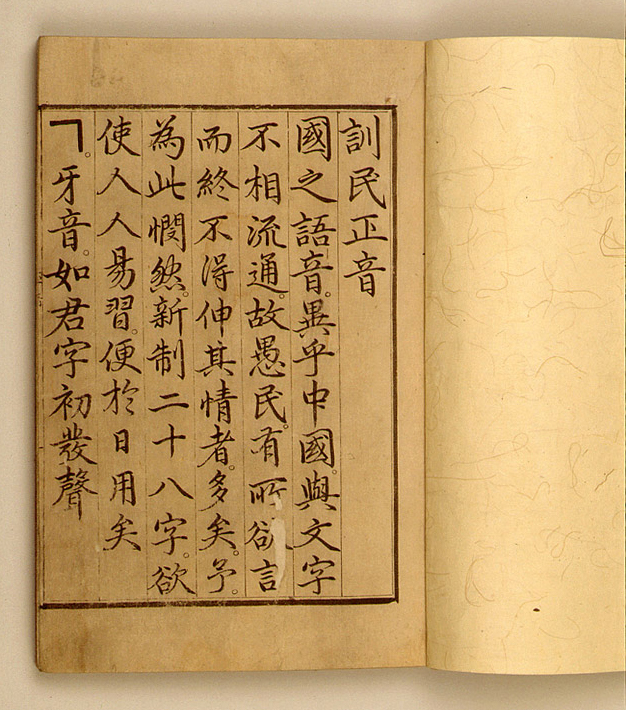
December 30: King Sejong the Great of Korea introduces the standardized Korean alphabet in the Hunminjeongeum.

Year 1443 (MCDXLIII) was a common year starting on Tuesday of the Julian calendar.

== Events ==
=== January–March ===
- January 1 –
  - Pope Eugene IV called for Christians under his jurisdiction to participate in the Crusade of Varna against the incursions of the Ottoman Empire into Central Europe.
  - The coronation of Christoffer III as King of Denmark and of his wife Dorothea of Brandenburg, as Queen Consort, took place at the Vor Frue Maria Dormkirke in Ribe, nearly three years after he had first claimed the throne on April 9, 1440.
- January 28 – Raffaele Adorno was elected as the new Doge of the Republic of Genoa.
- February 26 – The Spanish monarch, King Alfonso V of Aragon, makes a triumphant entrance into the city of Naples in order to assume the throne of the Kingdom of Naples.
- March 11 – At the age of 16 months old, Charlotte of Savoy, daughter of Louis, Duke of Savoy, is betrothed in a ceremony to Frederick III of the House of Wettin, the 4-year-old son of Frederick II, Elector of Saxony. No marriage takes place, however, and Charlotte will marry the Crown Prince of France in 1451.

=== April–June ===
- April 12 – Henry Chichele, the Roman Catholic Archbishop of Canterbury for almost 29 years, dies and is succeeded by John Stafford on May 13.
- April 23 – The Duke of York, Richard Plantagenet, signs a treaty with Isabella of Portugal, Duchess of Burgundy for an indefinite truce between the Kingdom of England and the Duchy of Burgundy.
- May 13 – John Stafford is appointed as the new Archbishop of Canterbury by Pope Eugene IV.
- June 5 – The strongest earthquake on record in Poland kills at least 30 people and damages buildings in Kraków and Wrocław, and in Timișoara and Oradea in Romania.
- June 6 – Afonso V of Aragon formally reunites the Kingdoms of Naples and Sicily.
- June 14 – Pope Eugene IV and King Alfonso V of Naples reach a forma agreement at Terracina, with the Pope recognizing Alfonso as the rightful King and Prince Ferrante as heir to the throne, while Alfonso agrees to stop support of the antipope Amadeus VII and the Council of Basel.

=== July–September ===
- July 22 – Battle of St. Jakob an der Sihl (Old Zurich War): The forces of the city of Zurich are defeated, but the Swiss Confederacy have insufficient strength to besiege and take the city.
- August 14 – The Siege of Dieppe, an attempt by England's Earl of Shrewsbury to capture the French port at Normandy and France's access to the English Channel, fails after nine months.
- September 28 – Pope Eugene IV returns to Rome for the first time in more than nine years, after having been forced to flee on June 4, 1434.

=== October–December ===
- October 22 – Pedro de Portugal, Duke of Coimbra and regent for the 11-year old King Afonso V, grants letters patent to his younger brother Dom Henrique of Navegador ("Prince Henry the Navigator"), giving Henrique an exclusive monopoly over all navigation south of Cape Bojador, whether for the purpose of war or trade, as well as a commission on any African goods or slaves brought back to mainland Portugal.
- November 8 – Battle of Niš: John Hunyadi and the army of the Crusade of Varna defeat three armies of the Ottoman Empire, and capture the city of Niš in modern-day Serbia; Skanderbeg deserts the Ottoman camp and goes to Albania.
- November 28 – Skanderbeg and his forces, rebelling against the Ottoman Empire, liberate Krujë, in Middle Albania, and raise the Albanian flag.
- December 12 – At the Battle of Zlatitsa in what is now Bulgaria, Ottoman troops under the Sultan Murad II and General Kasim Pasha defeat an attack by John Hunyadi and the forces of Hungary, Croatia, Poland and Serbia.
- December 24 –
  - The Christian crusaders under Hunyadi begin their retreat westward after their defeat at Zlatica, and the Ottoman forces follow them, with a confrontation ultimately taking place on January 2 at the Battle of Kunovica.
  - In Poland, Wenceslaus I, Duke of Siewierz sells the duchy of Siewierz to Zbigniew Oleśnicki, Bishop of Kraków, for 6,000 silver coins (Prague groschen), equivalent to at least 21 kilograms (46 lb) or 750 ounces of silver.
- December 30 – King Sejong the Great of Korea announces the creation of the Hunminjeongeum (literally "The Proper Sounds for the Instruction of the People") a manual for Hangul, a standardized writing system for the Korean language.

=== Date unknown ===
- In Moldavia, the conflict between brothers and co-rulers Iliaș and Stephen II reignites, and Stephen captures Iliaș and blinds him, thus remaining sole ruler of the country.
- Portuguese explorer Nuno Tristão penetrates the Arguin Gulf, off the west coast of Africa.
- King Sejong the Great starts to create Hangul, the native alphabet of the Korean language, with his scholars.
- Vlad II Dracul begins his second term as ruler of Wallachia, succeeding Basarab II.
- The Buddhist Zhihua Temple (智化寺) is built in Beijing, at the order of Wang Zhen, chief eunuch at the court of the Emperor Yingzong of Ming Dynasty China.
- A powerful earthquake destroys the Timișoara Fortress in the Kingdom of Hungary

== Births ==
- January 27 – Albert III, Duke of Saxony (d. 1500)
- February 2 – Elisabeth of Bavaria, Electress of Saxony (d. 1484)
- February 12 – Giovanni II Bentivoglio, Italian noble (d. 1508)
- February 23 – Matthias Corvinus, of Hungary (d. 1490)
- May 17 – Edmund, Earl of Rutland, brother of Kings Edward IV of England and Richard III of England (d. 1460)
- May 29 – Victor, Duke of Münsterberg, Reichsgraf, Duke of Münsterberg and Opava, Count of Glatz (d. 1500)
- May 31 or 1441 – Margaret Beaufort, Countess of Richmond and Derby, English noble, mother of King Henry VII, grandmother of King Henry VIII of England (d. 1509)
- June 29 – Anthony Browne, English knight (d. 1506)
- September 9 – Muhammad Jaunpuri (d. 1505)
- November 10 – Adolf III of Nassau-Wiesbaden-Idstein, Germany noble (d. 1511)
- December 1 – Magdalena of France, French princess and regent of Navarre (d. 1495)
- December 5 – Pope Julius II (d. 1513)
- probable
  - Piero del Pollaiuolo, Italian painter (d. 1496)
  - Ygo Gales Galama, Frisian warlord and freedom fighting rebel (d. 1492)

== Deaths ==
- January 16 – Erasmo of Narni, Italian mercenary (b. 1370)
- January 28 – Robert le Maçon, Chancellor of France
- February – Guidantonio da Montefeltro, count of Urbino (b. 1377)
- March 24 – James Douglas, 7th Earl of Douglas (b. 1371)
- April 12 – Henry Chichele, Archbishop of Canterbury
- May – John II, Count of Nassau-Siegen
- May 9 – Niccolò Albergati, Italian cardinal and diplomat (b. 1373)
- June 5 – Ferdinand the Holy Prince of Portugal (b. 1402)
- August 16 – Ashikaga Yoshikatsu, Japanese shōgun (b. 1434)
- September 18 – Lewis of Luxembourg, Archbishop of Rouen
- date unknown – Infante Diogo, Constable of Portugal
  - Jelena Balšić, Serbian duchess (b. 1366)
- probable – Zeami Motokiyo, Japanese actor and playwright (b. 1363)
