= Battle of Melstica =

1444 battle during the Ottoman–Hungarian Wars

- Part of the Crusade of Varna and the Hungarian–Ottoman Wars
Date	24 December 1443
Location	Melstica, Bulgaria
Result	Inconclusive

Belligerents
Kingdom of Hungary; Kingdom of Croatia; Kingdom of Poland; Serbian Despotate	Ottoman Empire

Commanders and leaders
John Hunyadi	(Ottoman Empire) Murad II (Ottoman Empire) Kasim Pasha (Ottoman Empire) Turahan Bey

Strength
Unknown	Unknown

Casualties and losses
Heavy	Heavy

The Battle of the Melstica was fought between the army of the Kingdom of Hungary and the Ottoman Empire in 1443.

== Background ==
Ottoman Campaigns of John Hunyadi, 1440–1456

After the crusader forces were defeated at the Battle of Zlatitsa they were forced to march back home due to the harsh winter and the Ottomans ability to defend their positions. Hunyadi defended the rear guard of the army before the battle took place.

== Battle ==
Sources differ from one another about the battle and its outcome. According to some sources the ottomans did not engage the Hungarians to a "larger" degree and thus the outcome of the battle is inconclusive.

While other sources say that the Ottomans did engage the Hungarians which saw the Hungarians on the winners side.

== Aftermath ==
After the battle the crusades continued their retreat back to friendly territory the Ottomans yet again attacked the Hungarians at the Battle of Kunovica.

== See also ==
- Long Campaign
- History of the Crusades
- Wagon fort
