= Kashifi =

Kashefi or Kashifi may refer to:

- Husayn Kashifi (1436-1504), 15th century Persian prose-stylist and Islamic scholar
- Kashifi (Ottoman poet), 15th century Ottoman poet
- Ken Jebsen (born 1966, as Moustafa Kashefi), German journalist
- Seyed Ali Kashefi Khansari (born 1972), Iranian poet
- Elham Kashefi, 21st century Iranian academic
