= Khaneh Sar =

Khaneh Sar (Persian: خانه سر) may refer to:

- Khaneh Sar, East Azerbaijan
- Khaneh Sar, Gilan
- Khaneh Sar, Rahimabad, Gilan Province
- Khaneh Sar, Mazandaran

== See also ==
- Khansar (disambiguation)
