= Đurađ Branković =

Despot of Serbia from 1427 to 1456

- Despot of the Kingdom of Rascia
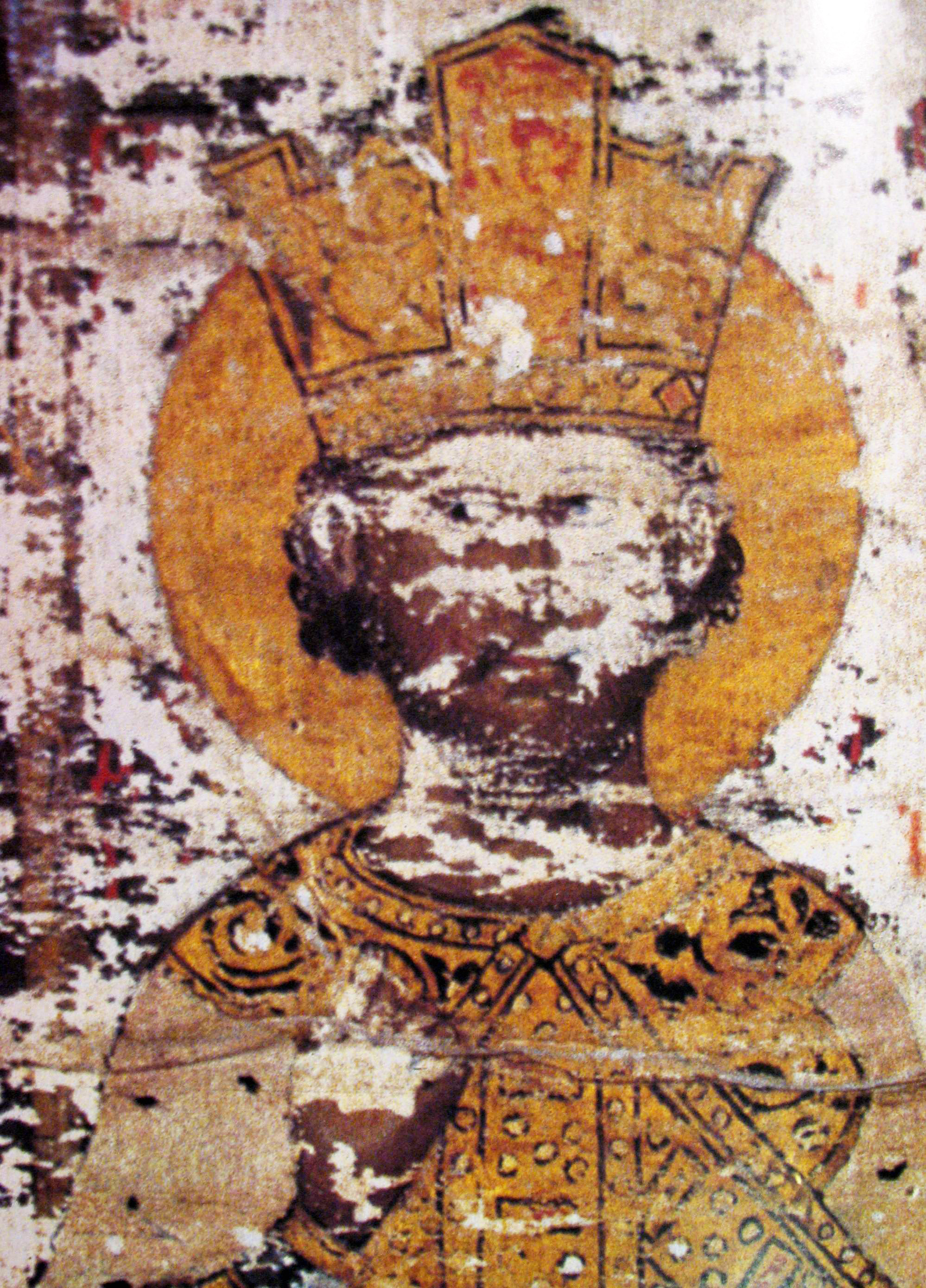
- Portrait from The Esphigmen Charter of despot Đurađ Branković, issued to the monastery of Esphigmen on Athos in 1429

Lord of Branković domain
- Reign: 1396–1412
- Predecessor: Vuk Branković

Despot of Serbia
- Reign: 1427–1456
- Predecessor: Stefan Lazarević
- Successor: Lazar Branković
- Born: 22 February 1377; Pristina
- Died: 24 December 1456 (aged 79); Smederevo Fortress
- Spouse: Eleni of Trebizond disputed Irene Kantakouzene
- Issue: Todor Branković; Grgur Branković; Mara Branković; Stefan Branković; Katarina, Countess of Celje; Lazar Branković
- House: Branković
- Father: Vuk Branković
- Mother: Mara Lazarević

Đurađ Vuković Branković or George Branković (Serbian Cyrillic: Ђурађ Вуковић Бранковић, Hungarian: Brankovics György; 22 February 1377 – 24 December 1456) served as the Serbian Despot from 1427 to 1456, making him one of the final rulers of medieval Serbia.

In 1429, Branković was formally granted the Byzantine title of Despot by Emperor John VIII Palaiologos. Like many Christian rulers in Eastern Europe at the time, his rule was marked by Ottoman vassalage. Despite this, he often sought to strengthen Christian alliances while maintaining the appearance of loyalty to the Ottoman Empire. Branković is also remembered for constructing the Smederevo Fortress in the city of Smederevo, which became the last capital of medieval Christian Serbia. He risked his life defending Belgrade with 3,000 knights against an Ottoman army of 60,000 under the command of Mehmed II the Conqueror.

Despot Đurađ died in late 1456. Following his death, Serbia, Bosnia, and Albania fell under the dominance of Sultan Mehmed II. During his reign, Đurađ amassed a significant library of Serbian, Slavonic, Latin, and Greek manuscripts, making Smederevo a hub of Serbian culture. He was the first member of the Branković dynasty to hold the Serbian throne.

== Early life ==
He was the son of lord Vuk Branković and Mara Lazarević, the daughter of Prince Lazar Hrebeljanović. His wife, Eirene Kantakouzene, a granddaughter of Emperor John VI Kantakouzenos, was a Byzantine princess. According to some historians, however, Đurađ's first wife would have been the princess Eleni of Trebizond (1395–1410), daughter of Emperor Alexios IV of Trebizond. Her brother Thomas was the commander of Smederevo.

Despot Stefan Lazarević had appropriated for himself properties that were part of the hereditary lands of Vuk, which resulted in Vuk joining the opposition. Vuk entered a pact with the Ottomans when Stefan had left Ottoman service and joined Hungary, fueling the domestic conflict between the two cousins; Vuk befriended Musa Çelebi only out of revenge. The conflict went on for ten years. Once reconciled, Stefan tried to make the most of Đurađ, Vuk's son. Being childless, despot Stefan Lazarević made Đurađ his heir. When Đurađ succeeded Stefan, he was mature with great experience, aged 50 in 1427.

== Between two worlds ==
=== Despot of Serbia ===
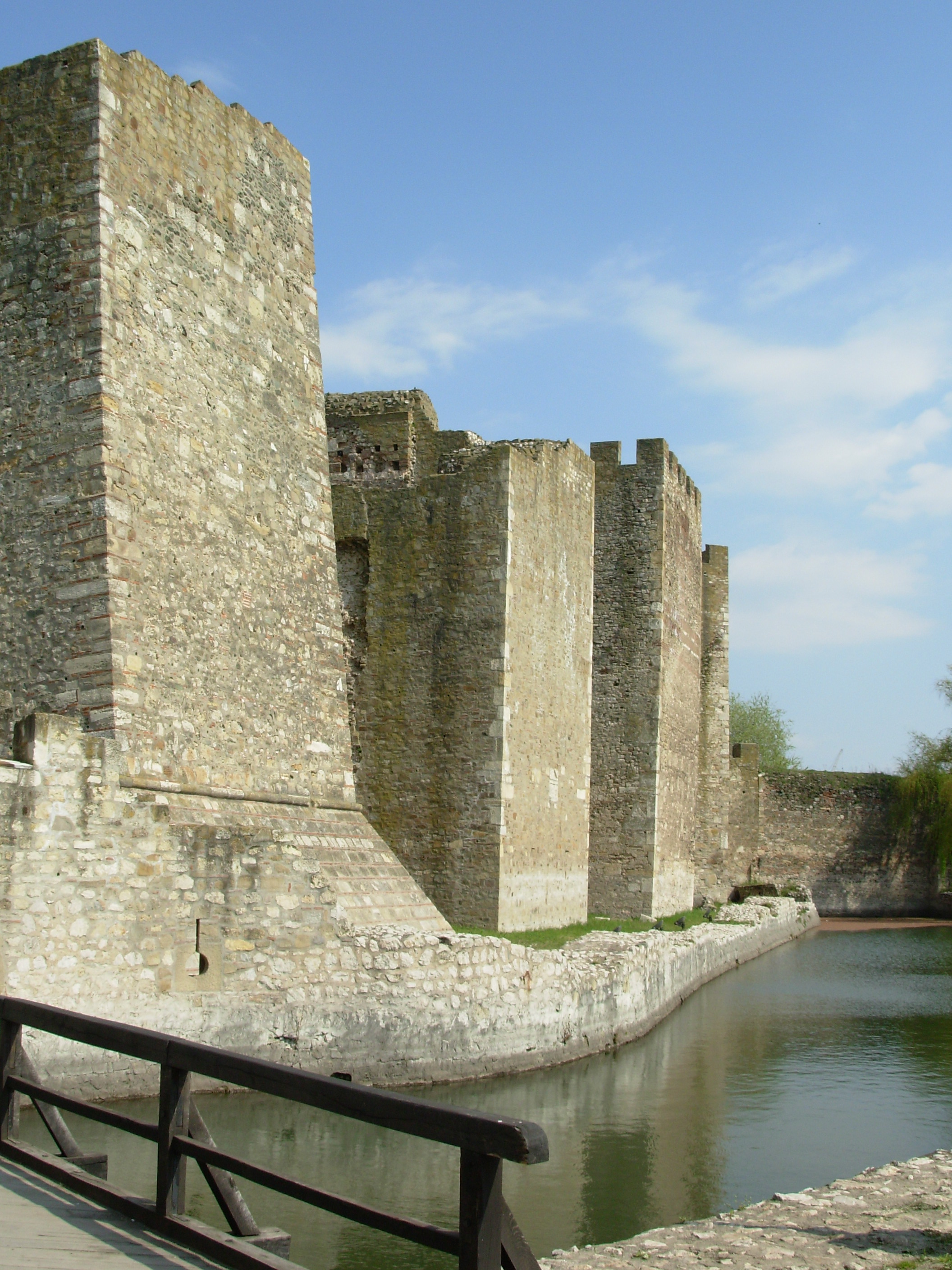
Smederevo Fortress, Đurađ's capital.

When Despot Stefan Lazarević died (19 July 1427), King Sigismund hurried to complete the obligations of the contract regarding Stefan's heir – his nephew Đurađ. From 17 September to 19 November, he was in Belgrade, which had been officially ceded to him. Under the Hungarian crown, Belgrade was also known as Nándor Alba and Nándorfehérvár. At the same time, Đurađ returned northern Mačva, and with the king's approval, kept the southern and western part of Mačva with Valjevo, Krupanj and Zajača. Meanwhile, the commander of Golubac, duke Jeremija, was unwilling to execute the command of giving the city to the Hungarians without a sum of 12,000 ducats; when he was declined the sum, he surrendered the city to the Ottomans.

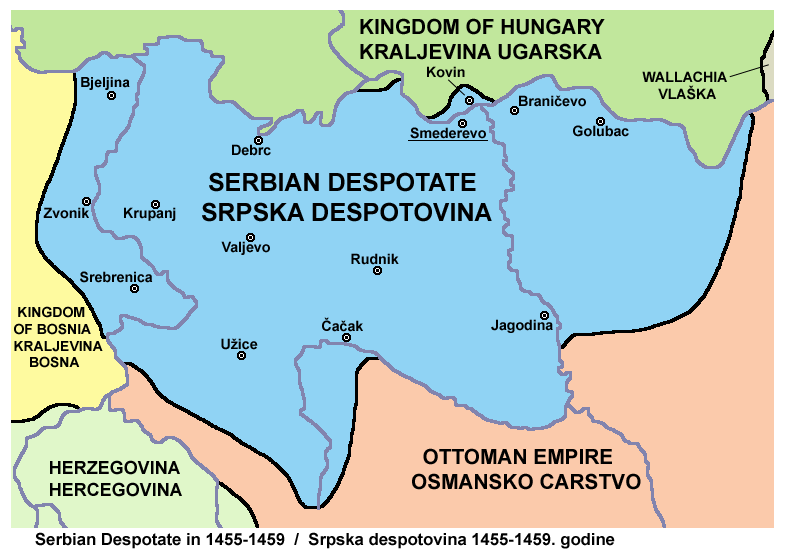
Serbian Despotate, 1455–1459

The Ottoman sultan reacted to the throne change and the Hungarian influence, which was felt more than he could afford, by sending an army into Serbia, which conquered Niš, Kruševac, and besieged Novo Brdo. To secure his prestige in Serbia, which had been weakened due to him, King Sigismund sent Despot Đurađ his own army. The combined army destroyed a large Ottoman detachment near Ravanica, for which effort the king, on 19 November 1427, thanked especially Nicholas Bocskay. Another Ottoman detachment attacked neighbouring Serbian and Hungarian places from Golubac, especially the Braničevo region. Despot Đurađ himself went below Golubac and promised Jeremija forgiveness, and tried in every way to win back the city; not only did Jeremija decline, but he also attacked the despot's entourage, which had tried to enter the city gates. In the spring of 1428, a new Hungarian army arrived at Golubac and besieged it from the land and from the Danube. The importance of the city is further evident from the fact that Sigismund himself led the army. But also Sultan Murat made a personal effort to encourage and support his acquired positions; in late May, after Sigismund, he arrived in the Braničevo area. Not wanting to enter combat with the superior Ottomans, Sigismund hastened to make peace. When the Hungarians in the first days of June began withdrawing, the Ottoman commander Sinan-beg attacked their rear, where Sigismund was; however, with the self-sacrifice of Marko de Sentlaszlo, they were saved from disaster. During these conflicts, south and eastern Serbia were very devastated, including the developed Daljš Monastery near Golubac. From a monastery document, Sigismund is for the first time called "Our Emperor" (naš car), unlike the Ottoman sultan, who was called a pagan or non-Christian Emperor (car jezičeski). When the Ottomans captured Thessalonica in 1430, Branković paid ransom for many of its citizens but could not avoid his vassal duties and sent one of his sons to join Ottoman forces when they besieged Durazzo and attacked Gjon Kastrioti.

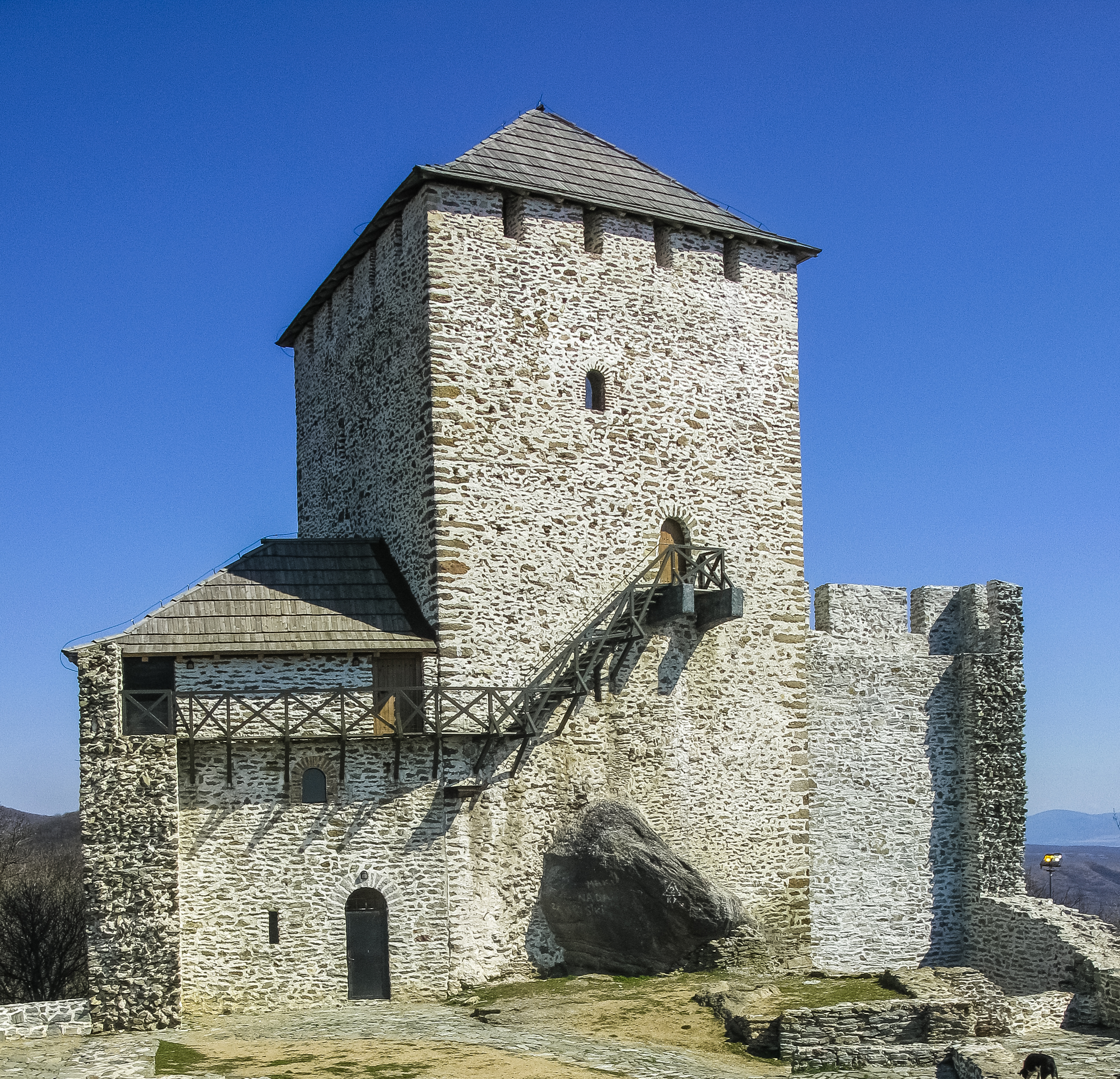
Vršac Castle was founded by Branković

In 1439, the Ottomans captured Smederevo, the Branković's capital. The prince fled to the Kingdom of Hungary, where he had large estates, which included Zemun, Slankamen, Kupinik, Mitrovica, Stari Bečej, Kulpin, Čurug, and others.

Despot Branković traveled from Hungary to Zeta, accompanied by several hundred cavalry and his wife Eirene. He first went to Zagreb, to his daughter Katarina, who was the wife of Ulrich II, Count of Celje. Then he arrived in Dubrovnik at the end of July 1440 and after several days continued his journey toward his coastal towns of Budva and Bar which became the new capital of the remaining part of his despotate. In August 1441, Branković arrived in Bar, where he stayed until the end of the winter 1440–41. There, he tried to mobilize forces to recapture the territory of the Serbian Despotate that he had lost to the Ottomans. During his visit to Zeta, he maintained communication with the garrison in Novo Brdo. Branković faced another disappointment in Zeta, where Crnojevići rebelled against Duke Komnen (Serbian: Војвода Комнен), the governor of Zeta. Branković left Zeta in April 1441. He first stayed in Dubrovnik, which angered Ottomans who requested that Dubrovnik should hand over Branković. The Ragusans refused this request with the explanation that Dubrovnik is a free city that accepts anybody who seeks shelter in it. They also emphasized that it was better for Branković to be in Dubrovnik as this was the best guarantee that he would not undertake any action against the Ottomans.

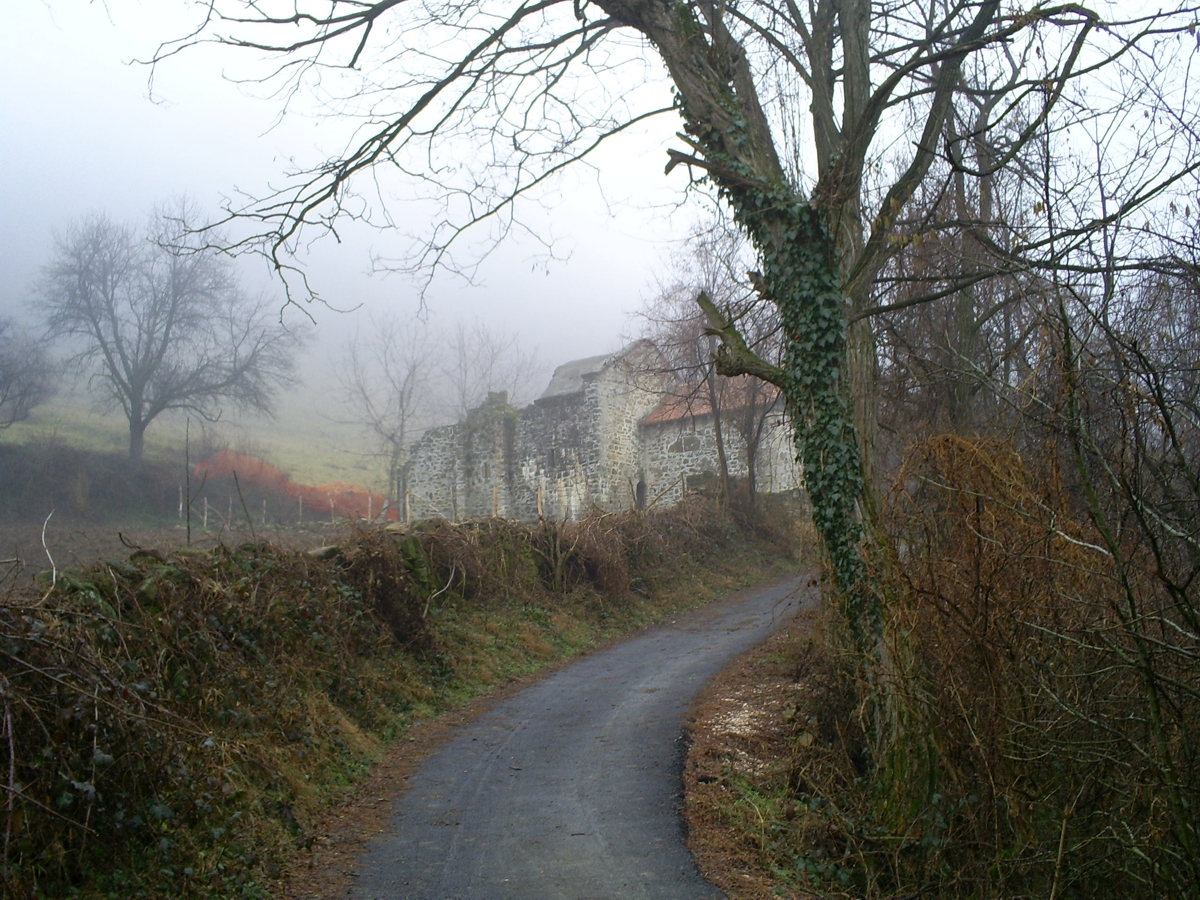
Remains of monastery church, possible burial place of the despot Đurađ Branković and his wife Eirene Kantakouzene.

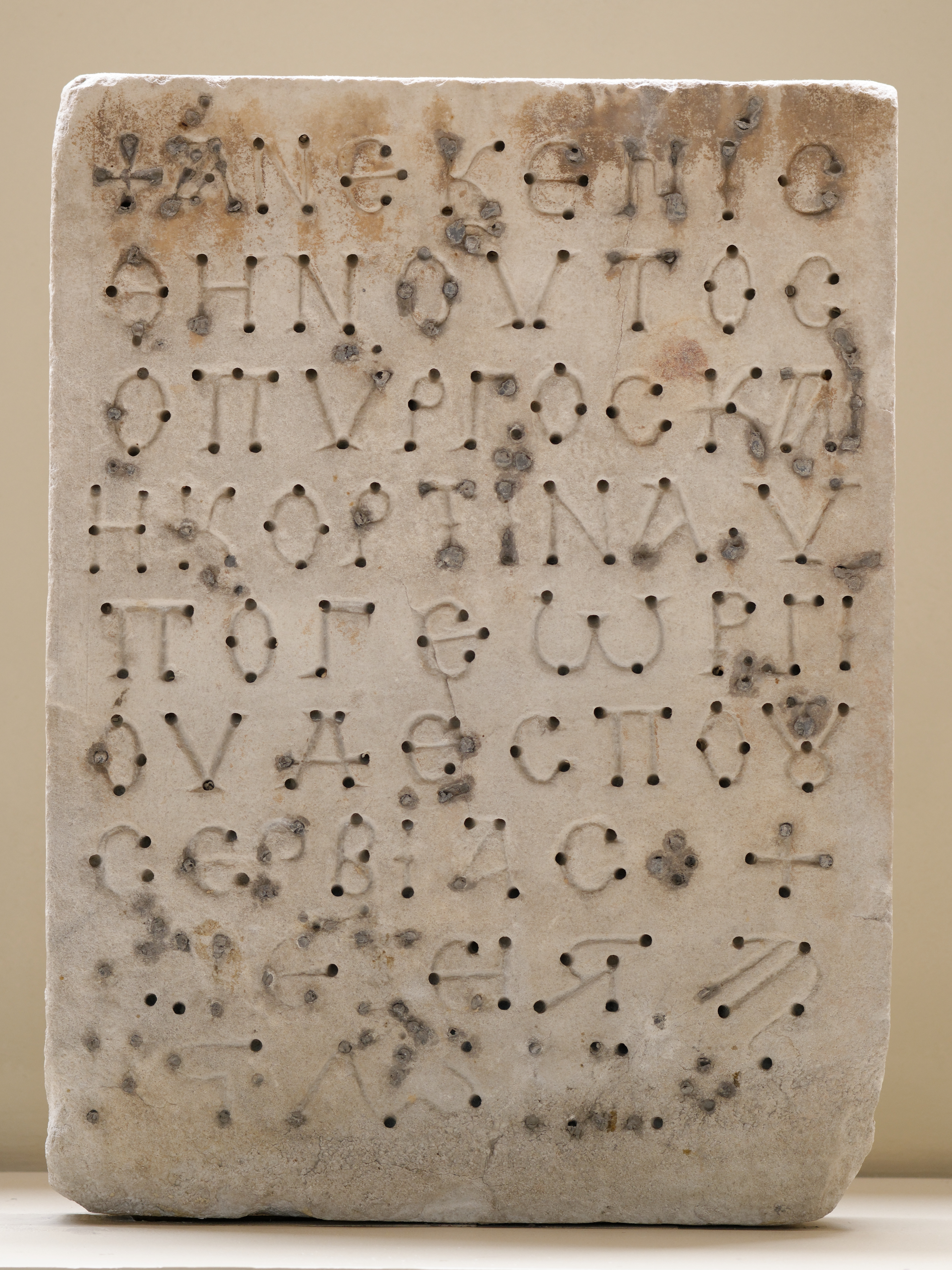
Marble plate of Despot Đurađ, originally on Walls of Constantinople in 1448, during the reign of Constantine XI Dragaš Palaiologos, today in Istanbul Archaeological Museum.

=== Crusade of Varna ===
Following the conflicts that concluded in 1443, Đurađ Branković had a significant role in the Battle of Niš and Battle of Zlatica and consequently in facilitating the Peace of Szeged (1444) between the Kingdom of Hungary and the Ottomans. Murad II, who also desired peace, was married to Đurađ's daughter Mara. On March 6, 1444, Mara sent an envoy to Đurađ; their discussion started the peace negotiations with the Ottoman Empire. This peace restored his Serbian rule, but Đurađ was forced to bribe John Hunyadi with his vast estates. On 22 August 1444, the prince peacefully took possession of the evacuated town of Smederevo.

=== Battle of Kosovo ===
The peace was broken in the same year by Hunyadi and King Władysław III of Poland during the Crusade of Varna, which culminated in the Battle of Varna. A crusading army led by Regent John Hunyadi of Hungary was defeated by Sultan Murad II's forces at Kosovo Polje in 1448. This was the last concerted attempt in the Middle Ages to expel the Ottomans from southeastern Europe. Although Hungary was able to successfully defy the Ottomans despite the defeat at Kosovo Polje during Hunyadi's lifetime, the kingdom fell to the Ottomans in the 16th century. Branković also captured Hunyadi at Smederevo for a short time when he was retreating home from Kosovo in 1448, due to their personal feud.

=== Return and death ===
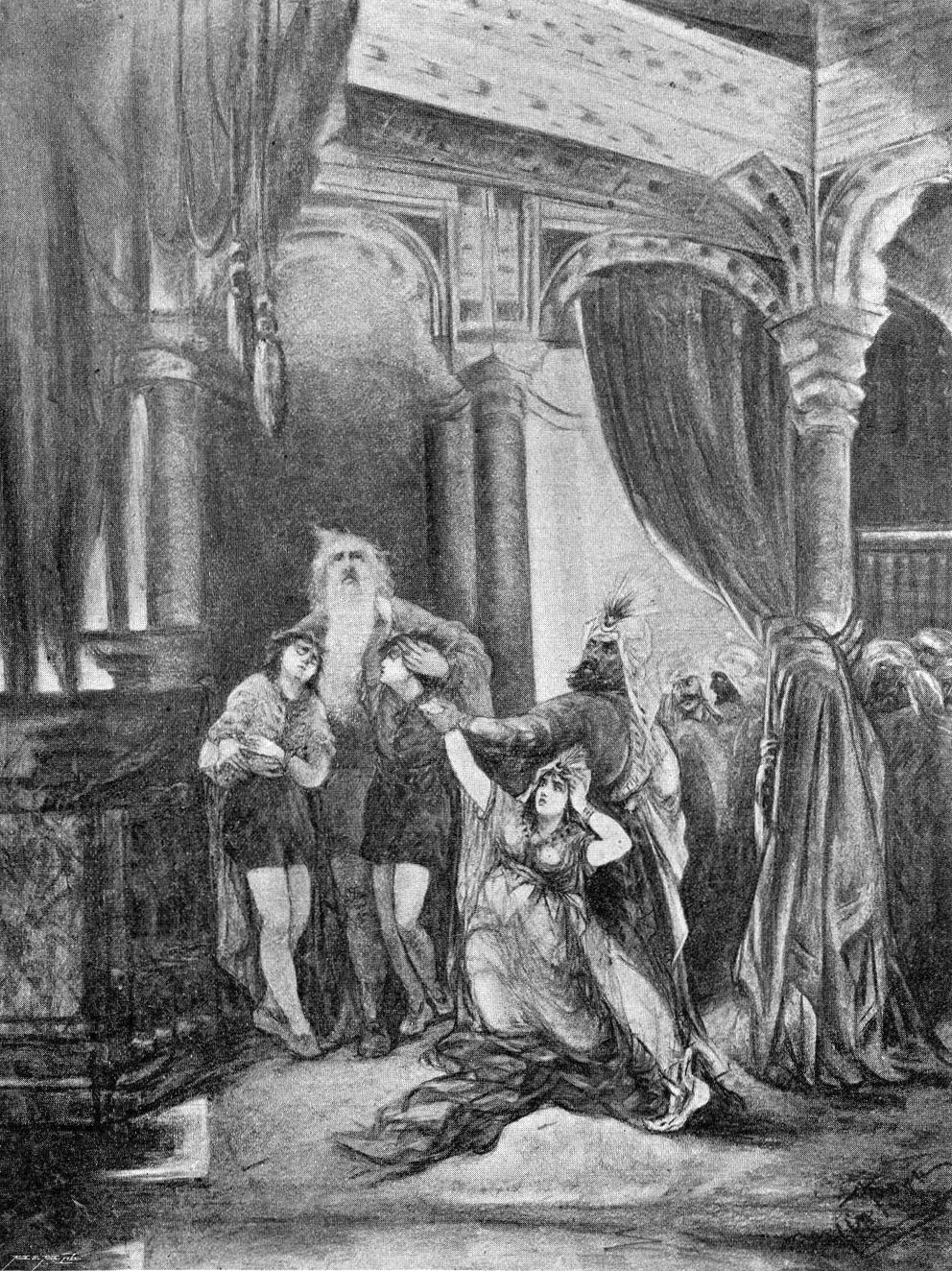
Đurađ Branković (1899) by Leon Koen

Following Hunyadi's victory over Mehmet II at the siege of Belgrade on 14 July 1456, a period of relative peace began in the region. The sultan retreated to Adrianople, and Branković regained possession of Serbia. Before the end of the year, however, the 79-year-old Branković died. Serbian independence survived him for only another three years, when the Ottoman Empire formally annexed his lands following dissension among his widow and three remaining sons. Lazar, the youngest, poisoned his mother and exiled his brothers, and the land returned to the sultan's subjugation.

== Person ==
His portrait in the illuminated manuscript of Esphigmenou (1429) depicts him with a mild beard, while the French nobleman Bertrandon de la Broquière who guested Đurađ in 1433 said of him "nice lord and large [in person]". He was deemed by contemporaries as the richest monarch in all of Europe; Broquière stated that his annual income from the gold and silver mines of Novo Brdo amounted to about 200,000 Venetian ducats. Among other sources of income, there were possessions in the Kingdom of Hungary, for which expenses were covered by the Hungarian crown. The annual income from them alone was estimated to be 50,000 ducats.

== Legacy ==
He is included in The 100 most prominent Serbs by the Serbian Academy of Sciences and Arts. The character of Đurađ Branković is portrayed by Baki Davrak in the Netflix original historical docudrama Rise of Empires: Ottoman (2020).

== Titles ==
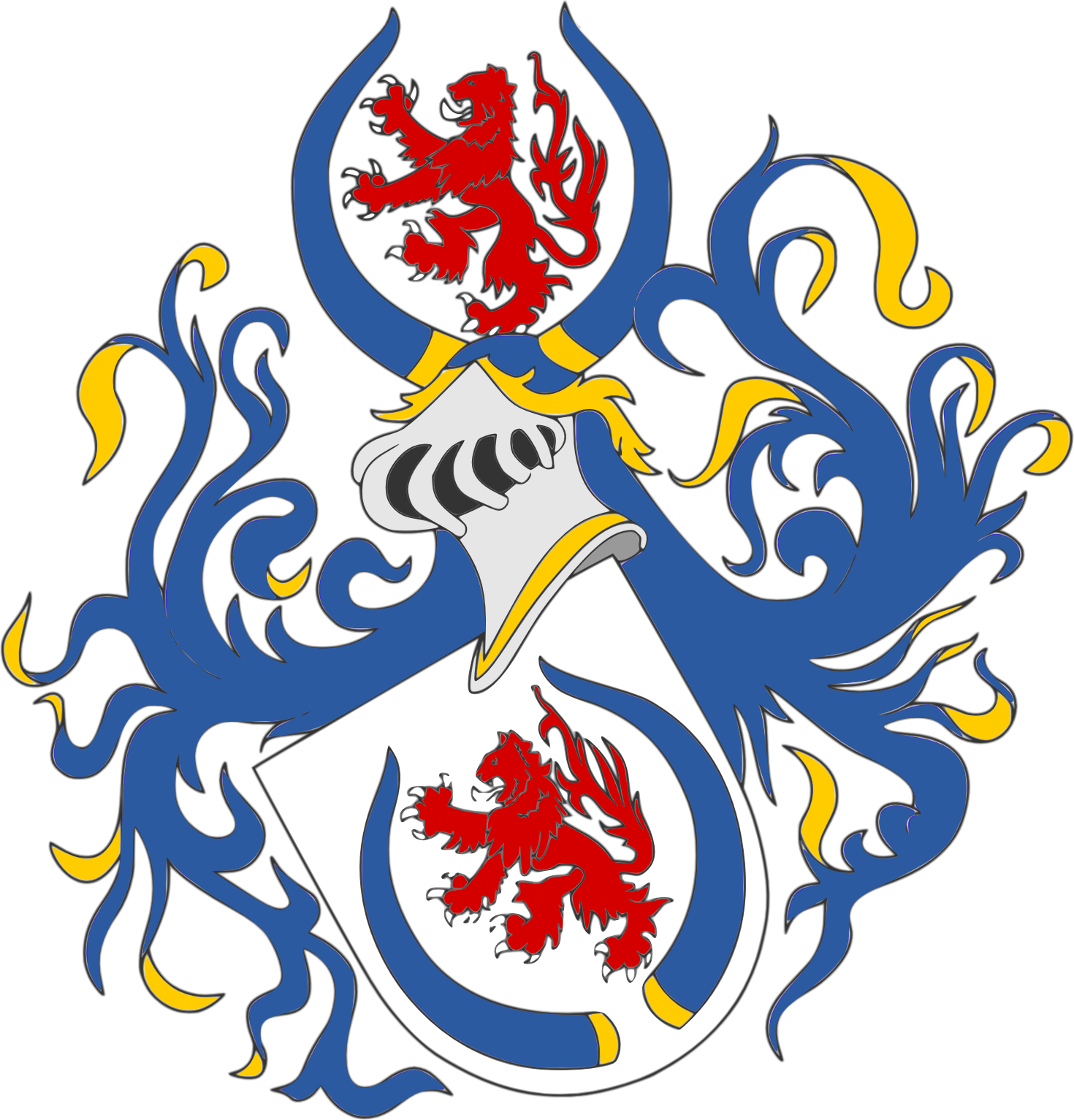
Branković's coat of arms

- "Despot of the Kingdom of Rascia and Lord of Albania" (Nos Georgius dei gracia Regni Rascie despotus et Albanie dominus and illustres principes, dominus Georgius, regni Rascie despotus et dominus Albanie).
- "Despot of all of the Kingdoms of Rascia and Albania" (illustris princeps, dux et despotus totius regni Rascie et Albaniae), by Sigismund in 1427.
- "Despot and Duke of Rascia" (illustris Georgius despotus seu dux Rascie), by Sigismund in 1429.
- "Lord of Rascia [and] Albania" (Georgius Wlk Rascie Albanieque dominus), in 1429.
- "Lord, Despot of the Serbs" (gospodin Srbljem despot), by Constantine of Kostenets in 1431.
- "Lord of the Serbs and Pomorije and Podunavije" (Господин Србљем и Поморију и Подунавију), in several official documents.
- "Despot, Lord of the Serbs and the Zetan Maritime" (господин Србљем и поморју зетскому).
- "Prince, Despot of the Kingdoms of Rascia and Albania" (illustrissimus princeps Georgius despotus regni Rascie et Albanie, Rive et totius Ussore dominus), in 1453.

== Marriage and children ==
Đurađ had at least six children:

- Todor (d. before 1429). Not mentioned in the Masarelli manuscript, probably died early
- Grgur (c. 1415–1459). Mentioned first in the Masarelli manuscript. Father of Vuk Grgurević, also blinded with Stefan in 1441.
- Stefan (c. 1417–1476). Mentioned third in the Masarelli manuscript. Blinded with hot irons in 1441. Claimed the throne of Serbia following the death of his younger brother Lazar.
- Katarina (c. 1418–1490). Married Ulrich II of Celje. Mentioned fourth in the Masarelli manuscript.
- Mara (c. 1420–1487). Mentioned second in the Masarelli manuscript. Married Murad II of the Ottoman Empire.
- Lazar (c. 1421–1458). Mentioned fifth and last in the Masarelli manuscript.

== See also ==
- Arača
- Branković dynasty
- Serbian Despotate

== Sources ==
- Ćirković, Sima (2004). The Serbs. Malden: Blackwell Publishing. ISBN 9781405142915.
- Fine, John Van Antwerp Jr. (1994) [1987]. The Late Medieval Balkans: A Critical Survey from the Late Twelfth Century to the Ottoman Conquest. Ann Arbor, Michigan: University of Michigan Press. ISBN 0472082604.

Regnal titles
Preceded by Stefan Lazarević	Despot of Serbia; 1427–1456	Succeeded by Lazar Branković
