= Khansar =

Khansar may refer to:

- Khansar, Iran
- Khansar, Yazd, Iran
- Khansar County, Iran
- Khansar, Pakistan
- Khansaar, fictional Indian city in the 2023 film Salaar

== See also ==
- Khaneh Sar (disambiguation)
- Khansari, an Iranian surname
