= Battle of Zlatitsa =

15th-century battle in present-day Bulgaria

- Part of the Crusade of Varna and the Hungarian–Ottoman Wars
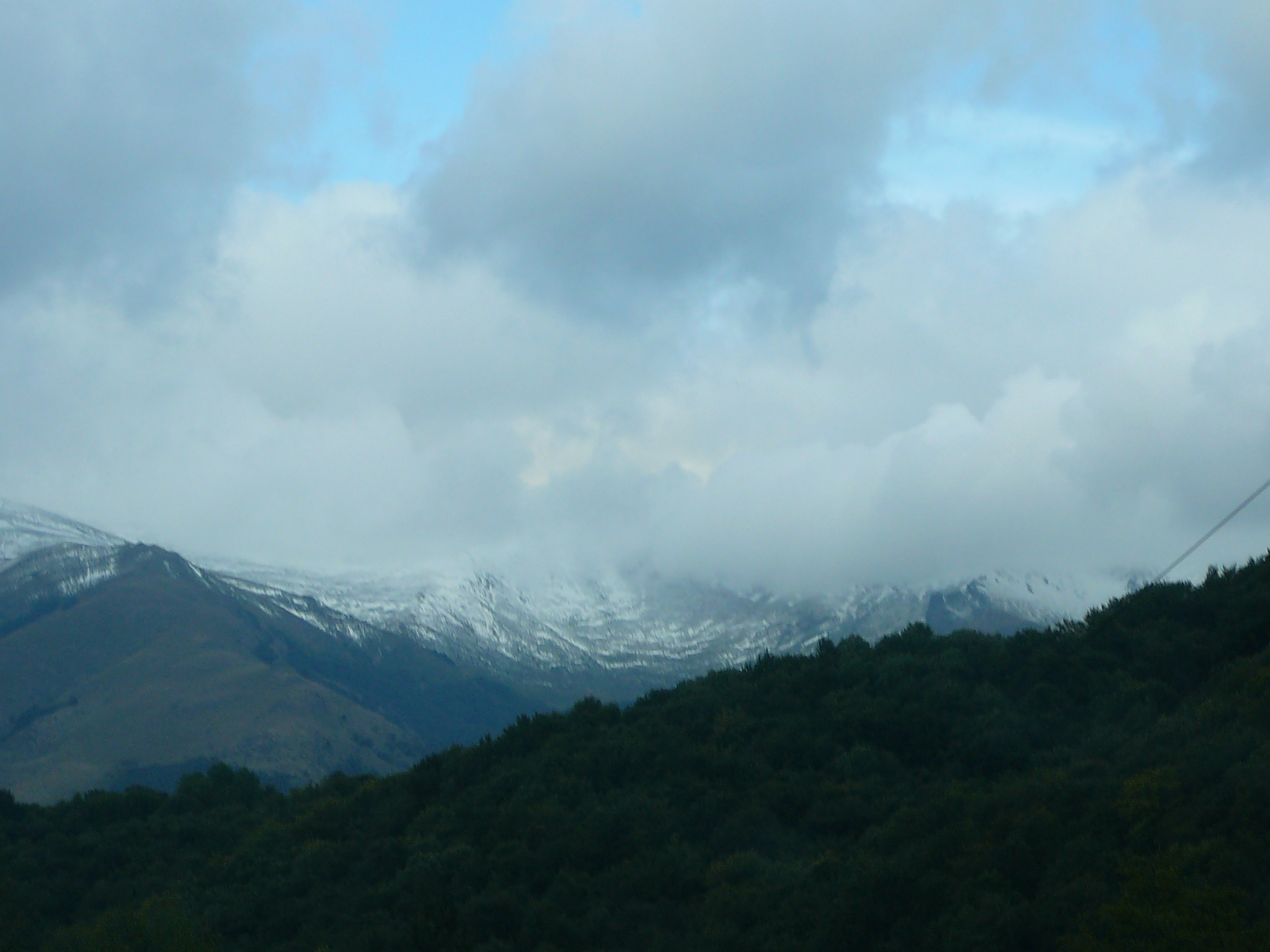
- Sredna Gora
Date	12 December 1443
Location	Zlatitsa pass in the Balkan Mountains, Ottoman Empire (modern-day Bulgaria)
Result	Ottoman victory

Belligerents
Kingdom of Hungary; Kingdom of Croatia; Kingdom of Poland; Serbian Despotate	Ottoman Empire

Commanders and leaders
John Hunyadi; Władysław III; Đurađ Branković; Julian Cesarini	(Ottoman Empire) Murad II (Ottoman Empire) Kasım Pasha (Ottoman Empire) Turahan Bey

Strength
40,000	(Ottoman Empire) 16,000

Casualties and losses
Heavy casualties during the battle and the subsequent retreat	(Ottoman Empire) Low

The Battle of Zlatitsa was fought on 12 December 1443 between the Ottoman Empire and Serbian and Hungarian troops in the Balkans as part of the larger Crusade of Varna. The battle was fought at Zlatitsa Pass (Bulgarian: Златишки проход) (Turkish: İzladi Derbendi) near the town of Zlatitsa in the Balkan Mountains, Ottoman Empire (modern-day Bulgaria). The impatience of the King of Poland and the severity of the winter then compelled John Hunyadi to return home in February 1444, but not before he had utterly broken the Sultan's power in Bosnia, Herzegovina, Serbia, Bulgaria, and Albania.

== Background ==
In 1440, John Hunyadi became the trusted adviser and most highly regarded soldier of King Władysław III of Poland. Hunyadi was rewarded with the captaincy of the fortress of Belgrade and was put in charge of military operations against the Ottomans. Władysław recognized Hunyadi's merits by granting him estates in Eastern Hungary. Hunyadi soon showed and displayed extraordinary capacity in marshaling its defenses with the limited resources at his disposal. He was victorious in Semendria over Isak-Beg in 1441, not far from Nagyszeben in Transylvania, where he annihilated an Ottoman force and recovered for Hungary suzerainty over Wallachia. In the year of 1442, John Hunyadi won four victories against the Ottomans, two of which were decisive. In March 1442, Hunyadi defeated Mezid Bey and the raiding Ottoman army at the Battle of Szeben in the south part of the Kingdom of Hungary in Transylvania. In September 1442, Hunyadi defeated a large Ottoman army of Beylerbey Şehabeddin, the Provincial Governor of Rumelia. This was the first time that a European army defeated such a large Ottoman force, composed not only of raiders, but of the provincial cavalry led by their own sanjak beys (governors) and accompanied by the formidable janissaries. These victories made Hunyadi a prominent enemy of the Ottomans and a renowned figure throughout Christendom and were prime motivators for him to undertake along with King Władysław the famous expedition known as the "Long Campaign" in 1443, with the Battle of Niš being the first major clash of this expedition. Hunyadi was accompanied by Giuliano Cesarini during the campaign. The battle took place in the plain between the Bolvan Fortress (near Aleksinac) and Niš on 3 November 1443. Ottoman forces were led by Kasım Pasha, the beglerbeg of Rumelia, Turahan Beg and Ishak-Beg. After the Ottoman defeat, the retreating forces of Kasım Pasha and Turahan Beg burned all of the villages between Niš and Sofia to hinder the crusaders in finding provisions. The Ottoman sources explain the Ottoman defeat by a lack of cooperation between the Ottoman armies led by different commanders. The Ottoman Sultan Murad II, who had been occupied with a war against the Karamanids, rushed to his European possessions in order to establish defenses on the crusader path to prevent them from reaching his capital Edirne. Turahan Bey convinced Murad to burn down Sofia and retreat to the Bulgarian mountains. Towards the end of November, the crusaders entered Sofia. Following the capture of the city, Hunyadi reported to the Saxon towns of Transylvania the Sultan had "fled towards the sea" and that he would in the Edirne within six or eight days. As it appeared later, the sultan had opted to block the two mountain passes leading to Edirne, one being an ancient Roman road named Trajan's Gate and another route named Zlatitsa Pass.

== Battle ==
Hunyadi opted for the less popular and more difficult route to Edirne through Zlatitsa, hoping to overcome the Ottomans with an unexpected maneuver. However by the time the crusaders had left Sofia the pass had already been blocked by the Turks, the troops guarding it led by Murad in person. The pass had been obstructed with large boulders and cut trees to make any attack by the crusaders difficult. At Zlatitsa, the crusaders met a major and well-fortified Ottoman army for the first time, as they had only clashed against local garrisons and hastily mobilized irregular troops along their route towards Edirne so far. The severely cold weather favored the position of the Ottoman defenders, led by Kasım Pasha and Turakhan Beg under the command of Murad. After the earlier rumors of the sultan's flight, the situation likely came as a surprise to many in the Christian army. Nevertheless, on the twelfth of December Hunyadi tried to break through the pass, using artillery and trusting in the superior armor of his army. The crusaders intended to continue their advance toward Adrianople through the forests of Sredna Gora after forcing the pass. The attempt proved futile, however, and the Ottoman forces made up of Janissaries, Azeps and Kapıkulus were able to successfully stop the offensive of the crusaders. Hunyadi himself almost fell into Ottoman hands, and the decision was made to withdraw from the pass. It was only the wagon fort defense that saved the retreating army from destruction at Ottoman hands. Hunyadi and his troops covered the retreat, and there may have been one last attempt to lure the Ottomans out of their well-defended positions. If so, the plan almost worked, as the Ottomans were planning on attacking the crusaders who were retreating before Turahan Beg advised Murad against the potentially self-destructive offensive on the newly established wagon forts the Christians had formed outside of the pass, leading the Sultan to cancel the plan.

== Aftermath ==
After the Battle of Zlatica and the subsequent retreat of the crusaders, the battlefield and surrounding regions were completely destroyed. Serbia was devastated while Sofia was destroyed and burnt, turned into a "black field" with its surrounding villages being turned into "black charcoal". Only Đurađ Branković gained from the 1443 campaign.

As the Christians marched home, the Ottoman forces closely followed the retreating army. After an indecisive clash on the 24th of December near Melstica, the Sultan entrusted the task of pursuing the enemy to Kasım Pasha and Turakhan Beg and went back to the recently recaptured Sofia. Soon after this, the crusaders ambushed and defeated a pursuing Turkish force in the Battle of Kunovica, where Mahmud Bey, son-in-law of the Sultan and brother of the Grand Vizier Çandarlı Halil Pasha, was taken prisoner.

== Historical sources ==
There is some debate amongst historians as to the details and the outcome of the battle, as various sources give contradictory accounts. Historian Colin Imber argues that the battle was disastrous for the Christian forces, arguing the victory at the later battle of Kunovica created the illusion that the clash at Zlatitsa had been a Christian triumph. Further stating that "the illusion of victory" was one Władysław and especially Cesarini were "anxious" to maintain, pointing out the reports from Jehan de Wavrin stating that after the campaign, Cesarini was to go to the Pope, and in every place he went through, announce the great victories he and the King had won against the Turks, while keeping quiet about the losses suffered in the mountains, contradicting anyone who said anything about them. Similarly, Turkish Historian Halil İnalcık argues that the anonymous Ottoman chronicle Gazavât-ı Sultan Murad bin Mehmet Han, which describes the battle as an Ottoman victory, gives the most reliable account amongst all the Ottoman chronicles about the events related to the Battle of Zlatitsa and Battle of Varna. Polish historian Jan Dąbrowski, on the other hand, argues that the Christians were able to successfully drive the Turks away at Zlatitsa and proceeded farther on before retreating. His claim, however, is criticized by researcher John Jefferson in his book The Holy Wars of King Wladislas and Sultan Murad, who argues that Dąbrowski had confused the battles of Nish and Zlatitsa in his work, with Jefferson too agreeing on the Christian advance being halted at Zlatitsa.

== Sources ==
- Jefferson, John (2012). The Holy Wars of King Wladislas and Sultan Murad: The Ottoman-Christian Conflict from 1438–1444. Leiden: Brill Publishers. ISBN 978-90-04-21904-5.
- Pálosfalvi, Tamás (2018). From Nicopolis to Mohács: A History of Ottoman-Hungarian Warfare, 1389–1526. The Ottoman Empire and Its Heritage: Politics, Society and Economy 63. Leiden: Brill. ISBN 978-90-04-37565-9.
