= Peace of Szeged =

Peace treaty

The Treaties of Edirne and Szeged
- Drafted: 10 June – 14 August 1444
- Signed: 15 August 1444
- Location: Szeged
- Condition: 10 year truce agreed Ottomans: Pay an indemnity of 100,000 gold florins; Withdraw from Serbia and Albania; Return Serbia and Albania to Despot George Branković together with 24 castles including Smederevo, Golubac, Novobrdo; Release hostages
- Original signatories: Sultan Murad II; King Vladislaus
- Parties: Ottoman Empire; Hungary; Serbian Despotate

The Treaty of Edirne and the Peace of Szeged were two halves of a peace treaty between Sultan Murad II of the Ottoman Empire and King Vladislaus of the Kingdom of Hungary. Despot George Branković of the Serbian Despotate was a party to the proceedings. The treaty brought an end to the Christian crusade against the Ottomans with significant gains. Within a month Vladislaus abjured his oath at the urging of the papacy and the crusade continued. On 10 November 1444 it ended in disaster at the Battle of Varna where the crusaders were wiped out and Vladislaus disappeared.

The treaty was started in Edirne with discussions between Murad and Vladislaus' ambassador. Within a few days, it was sent to Szeged with Murad's ambassador, to be finalized and ratified by Vladislaus. Once it arrived, complications caused the negotiations to continue for several more days, and oaths were eventually given in Várad. The ratification took place on 15 August 1444 in Várad.

== Background ==
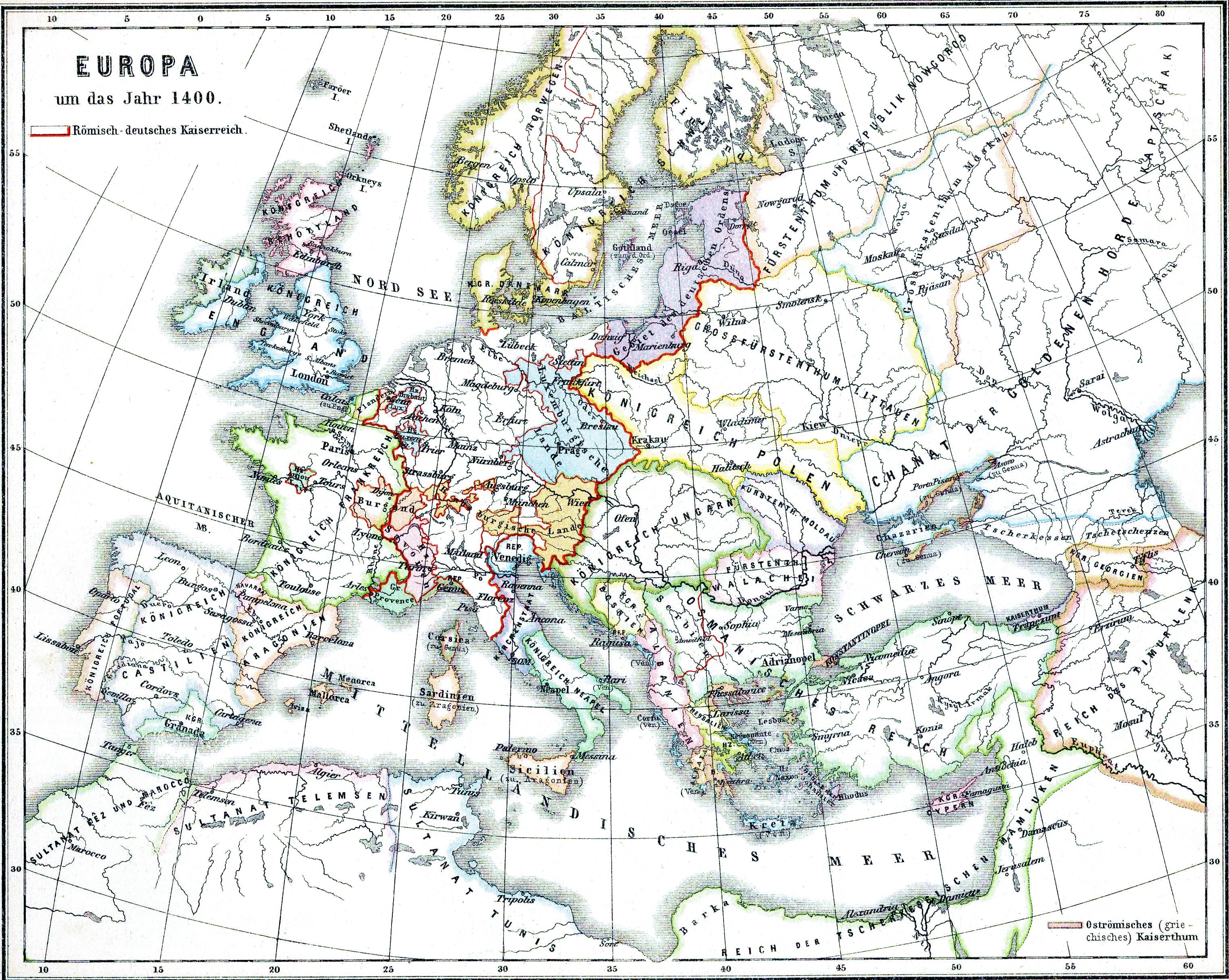
Europe in 1400

The Crusade of Varna officially began on 1 January 1443 with a crusading bull published by Pope Eugene IV. The fighting did not start as planned, however. The Hungarian and the Karamanid Turkish armies were supposed to attack the Ottoman Empire simultaneously. In the spring of 1443, before the Hungarians were ready, the Karamanids attacked the Ottomans and were devastated by Sultan Murad II's full army.

The Hungarian army, led by King Vladislaus, who had come to the throne three years earlier in contentious circumstances, the Hungarian general of romanian origin John Hunyadi, also known as Iancu de Hunedoara, and Serbian Despot George Branković, attacked in mid-October. They won the first encounters and forced Kasim Pasha of Rumelia and his co-commander Turakhan Beg to abandon their camp and flee to Sofia, Bulgaria to warn Murad of the invasion. They burnt all the villages on their path of retreat in a scorched earth strategy. When they arrived in Sofia they advised the Sultan to burn the city and retreat to the mountain passes beyond, where the Ottoman's smaller army would not be at such a disadvantage. Shortly after, bitter cold set in.

The next encounter, at Zlatitsa Pass just before Christmas 1443, was fought in the snow and the Hungarians were defeated. As they in turn retreated they ambushed and defeated a pursuing force at the Battle of Kunovica, where Mahmud Bey, brother-in-law of the Sultan and brother of the Grand Vizier Çandarlı Halil Pasha, was taken prisoner. This gave the Hungarians the illusion of an overall Christian victory, and they returned triumphant. The King and the church were both anxious to maintain this illusion and gave instructions to spread word of the victories, but contradict anyone who mentioned the defeats. Murad, meanwhile, returned angry at the unreliability of his forces and imprisoned Turakhan, blaming him for the army's setbacks and Mahmud Bey's capture.

=== Initial negotiations ===
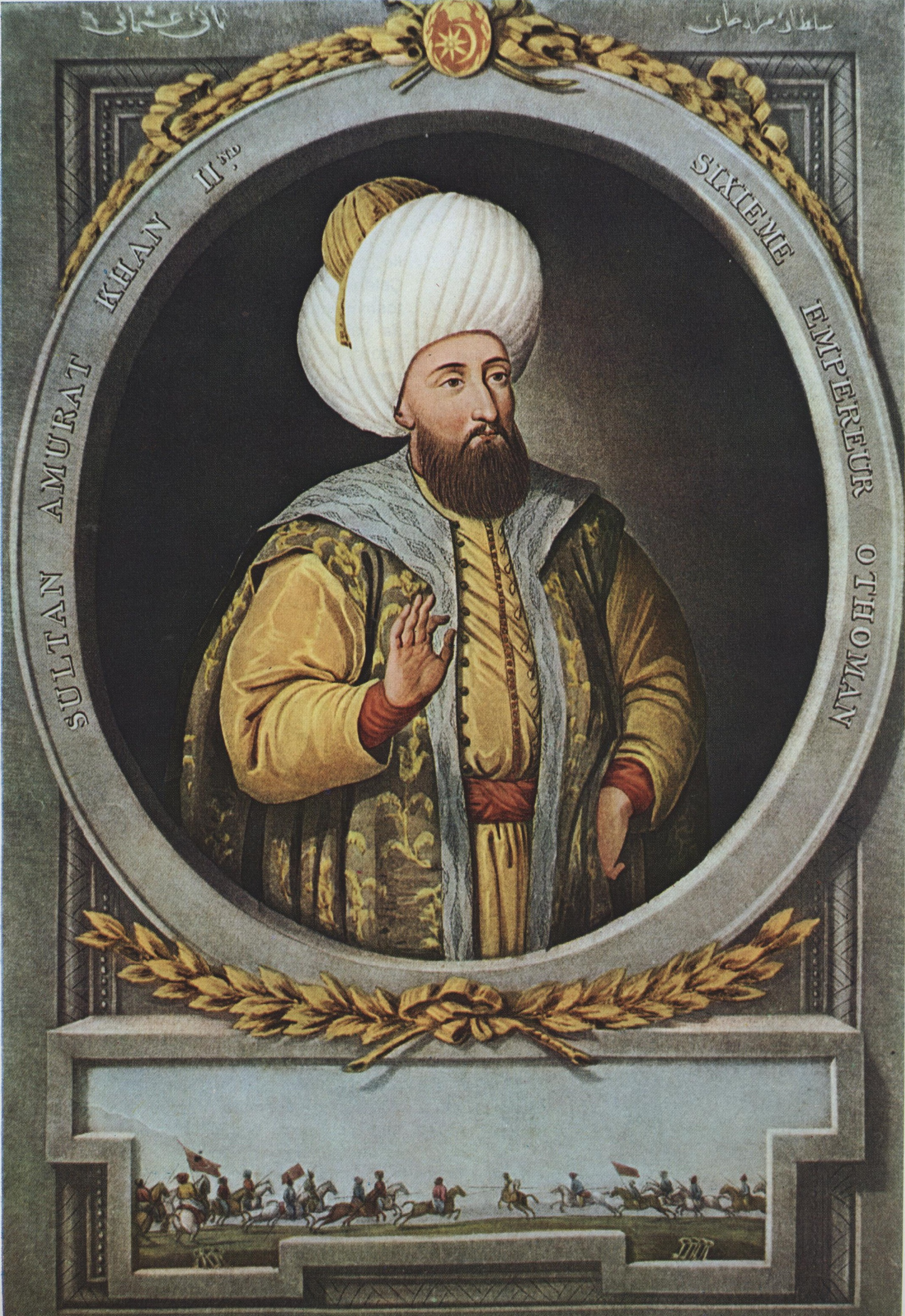
Sultan Murad II

Murad is believed to have wanted an end to the war. His sister begged him to obtain her husband's release, and his wife Mara, daughter of George Branković, added additional pressure. On 6 March 1444 Mara sent an envoy to Branković; their discussion started the peace negotiations with the Ottoman Empire.

On 24 April 1444 Vladislaus sent a letter to Murad, stating that his ambassador, Stojka Gisdanić, was travelling to Edirne with full powers to negotiate on his behalf. He asked that once an agreement was reached, Murad send his own ambassadors with the treaty and his sworn oath to Hungary, at which point Vladislaus could also swear peace. On the same day Vladislaus held a diet at Buda, where he swore before Cardinal Julian Cesarini to lead a new expedition against the Ottomans in the summer.

== Edirne ==
Early negotiations resulted in the release of Mahmud Bey, who arrived at Edirne in early June 1444. Vladislaus' ambassador Stojka Gisdanić arrived soon after, along with, as required by a law signed by King Albert, Hunyadi's representative Vitislav, and two representatives for Branković. At the behest of Pope Eugene IV, the antiquarian Ciriaco Pizzicolli was also present to monitor the progress of the crusade plans.

During the negotiations the most contentious point was the possession of the Danubian fortresses, especially Golubac and Smederevo, which the Ottomans wished to retain. However, on 12 June 1444, after three days of discussion, the treaty was hastily completed because İbrahim II of Karaman had invaded Murad's lands in Anatolia.

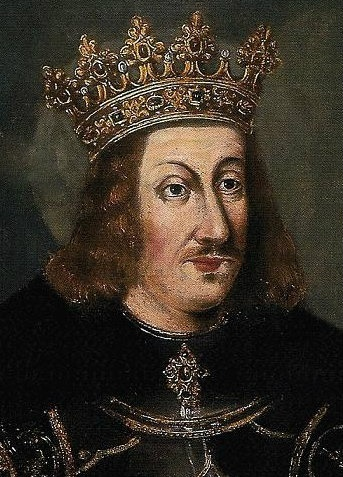
Vladislaus, King of Poland and Hungary

The final terms stated that Murad would return 24 Serbian cities, including the large fortresses of Golubac and Smederevo, to the exiled Branković. Murad was also obliged to release Branković's two blinded sons, Grgur and Stefan. The restored Serbian Despotate was vassalaged to the Ottomans, so he had to pay taxes and offer military aid. A ten-year truce was established with Hungary, and Vlad II Dracul, Voivode of Wallachia, was no longer obliged to attend Murad's court, though he was still required to pay tribute. Once Murad had sworn an oath to observe the treaty, it was sent to Hungary with Baltaoğlu Süleyman and a Greek, Vranas, for ratification by Vladislaus, Hunyadi, and Branković.

== Intervening politicking ==
Despite the treaty negotiations, planning for the crusade against the Ottomans continued. It is generally assumed that Vladislaus knew the results of the negotiations in Edirne by the beginning of July. Yet on 2 July 1444, at the urging of Cardinal Cesarini, Vladislaus reassured his allies of his intention to lead the crusade by declaring he would head to Várad on 15 July to assemble an army.

A crusade would add legitimacy to Vladislaus' claim to the throne, and the Polish faction especially wanted verification of his right to rule over the three-year-old Ladislaus, rightful king of Hungary. He was also coerced by the persuasive Cesarini, who fervently believed in the crusade. By the time the King made his declaration word of the peace negotiations had spread, prompting additional pressure from pro-crusaders, including Despot Constantine Dragases, to renounce the treaty. Meanwhile, in Poland there was civil strife, and a faction there demanded he return to end it. The losses during the previous winter also spoke against continuing the war.

Vladislaus was not the only one to be coerced. A letter written by Ciriaco Pizzicolli on 24 June 1444 begged Hunyadi to ignore the peace, stating the Turks were terrified "and preparing their army for retreat rather than battle". He continued by explaining that the treaty would allow Murad "to avenge the defeat that [Hunyadi] inflicted on him in the recent past" and that Hungary and the other Christian nations should invade Thrace after "[declaring] a war worthy of the Christian religion".

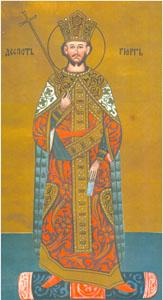
Đurađ Branković, Despot of Serbia

Branković had a much larger interest in the peace treaty going through, and solicited Hunyadi's support. The expectation was that Serbia would be returned to Branković upon ratification of the treaty, and as such, he bribed Hunyadi by promising him the land he held in Hungary. On 3 July 1444 the lordship of Világosvár was transferred, in perpetuity, to Hunyadi. Around the same time, as additional security, the estates of Mukačevo, Baia Mare, Satu Mare, Debrecen, and Böszörmény were also transferred, and Hunyadi became the largest landowner in the Kingdom.

Shortly after Vladislaus' declaration, around the same time as writing the letter to Hunyadi, Ciriaco passed the news to the Pope, who in turn informed Cesarini. Cesarini, meanwhile, had staked his career on the crusade, a product of his supporting the Pope against the Council of Basel, which he had abandoned in the late 1430s. He was therefore left with the necessity of finding a solution satisfactory to both sides.

== Szeged ==
At the beginning of August, the Ottoman ambassadors Baltaoğlu and Vranas arrived in Szeged. On 4 August 1444 Cardinal Cesarini implemented the solution he had created for the King. With Hunyadi, the barons, and the prelates of the Kingdom of Hungary in attendance, Vladislaus solemnly agreed to "abjure any treaties, present or future, which he had made or was to make with the Sultan". Cesarini had carefully worded the declaration such that negotiations could continue and the treaty could still be ratified by oath, without removing the possibility of a crusade or breaking the terms of the treaty because the oath was invalidated even before it was given.

Despite Cesarini's solution, the negotiations lasted for ten days. The final version of the treaty re-established Serbia as a buffer state and settled its return to Branković, as well as the return of Albania and all other territory conquered, including 24 fortresses, to Hungary. The Ottomans also had to pay an indemnity of 100,000 gold florins and release Branković's two sons. Hungary, meanwhile, agreed to not attack Bulgaria or cross the Danube, and a truce of 10 years was established. It is also suspected that Branković, who gained the most from the treaty, concluded his own private negotiations with Baltaoğlu, though the results are unknown. On 15 August 1444 the treaty was ratified in Várad with oaths by Hunyadi, for both himself and "on behalf of the King himself and all the people of Hungary", and Branković.

== Consequences ==
On 22 August 1444, a week after the negotiations were finalized, Branković retook Serbia. During that week, Vladislaus also offered the throne of Bulgaria to Hunyadi, if he was amenable to abjuring his oath, which he was. By mid-September, all transfers, both those decreed by the treaty and those by background negotiations, were completed, allowing the crusade to become Hungary's primary focus.

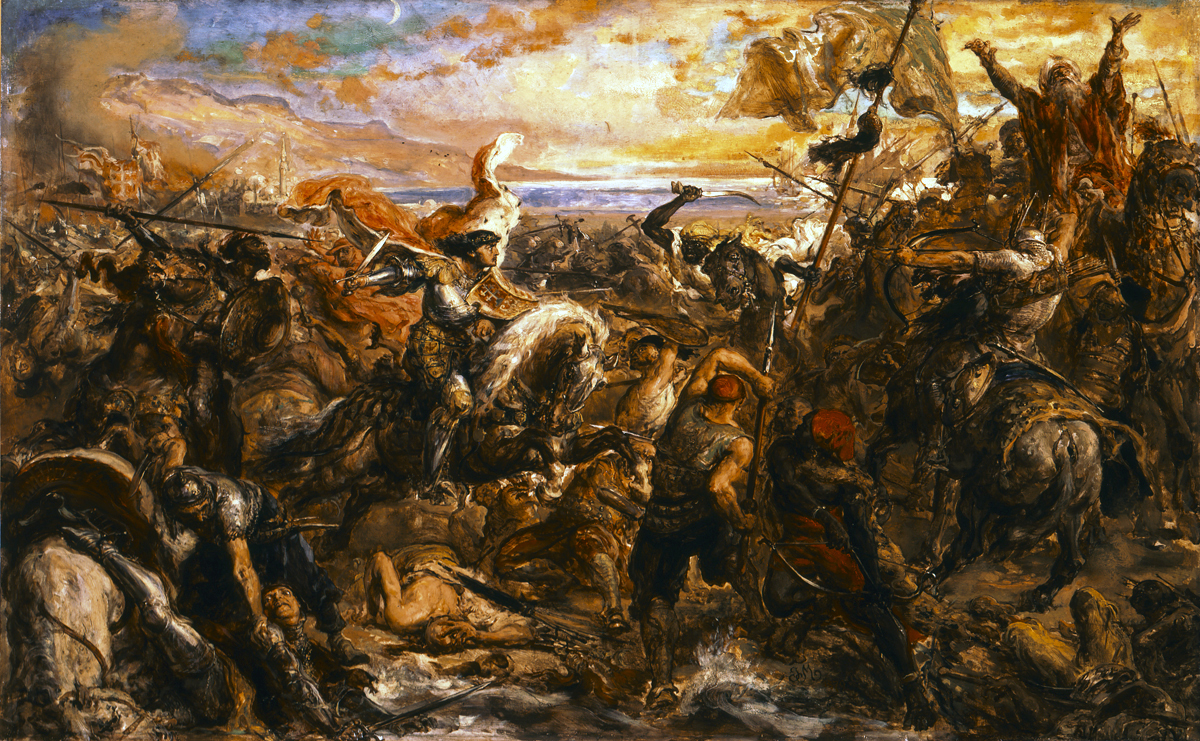
King Vladislaus at the Battle of Varna

The Ottoman Empire, meanwhile, had not heard of Cesarini's invalidation of the treaty. By the end of August 1444, the Karamanids were subdued, leaving Murad with the impression that his borders were secure. He expected that the favorable terms granted in both the Peace of Szeged and the settlement with İbrahim II of Karaman would give a lasting peace. Shortly after the Karamanids' submission, therefore, Murad abdicated in favor of Mehmed II, his twelve-year-old son, intending to enjoy a peaceful retirement.

Murad's hope was not fulfilled. By late September Hungary's preparations for the crusade were complete, and those of their allies were well underway. Many formerly independent Ottoman fringe territories began reclaiming their land, and on 20 September 1444 the Hungarian army began marching south from Szeged. The march went well for the Hungarians, prompting the Ottomans to recall Murad. On 10 November 1444 the two armies clashed at the Battle of Varna, the Ottomans fighting under Murad's standard with the broken treaty nailed to it. The crusaders were decisively defeated and Vladislaus disappeared. Hungary relapsed into civil war and the removal of the threat to the Ottoman's Balkan front allowed them to concentrate forces for the conquest of Constantinople (Istanbul) in 1453.
