= Khansari =

Khansari (Persian: خوانساری, related to Khvansar or Khvansar County in Isfahan Province, Iran) is a Persian language surname which is also common among the Iranian diaspora. Notable people with the surname include:

- Adib Khansari (1901–1982), Iranian musician
- Ahmad Khansari (1891–1951), Iranian cleric
- Mohammad Hadi Ghazanfari Khansari (born 1957), Iranian Twelver Shi'a cleric
- Yadollah Kaboli Khansari (born 1949), Iranian calligrapher
- Seyed Ali Kashefi Khansari (born 1972), Iranian writer

== See also ==
- Khonsari, another transcription of the same Iranian surname
- Khonsary, another transcription of the same Iranian surname
- Khansar (disambiguation)
