= Kashifi (Ottoman poet) =

Author of Ḡazā-nāma-ye Rum

Kashifi (also spelled Kaşifi or Kashefi; fl. 1456 or c. 1478 – died 15th century) was an Ottoman poet of Iranian origin. He wrote the Ḡazā-nāma-ye Rum, an epic Persian-language poem about the lives of Sultans Murad II (r. 1421–1444) and Mehmed II (r. 1444–1446, 1451–1481).

== Biography ==
Details about Kasifi's personal life are scant. The date of his birth is unknown, although he flourished in 1456 or c. 1478. According to Osman G. Özgüdenlı, his place of birth is also unknown. According to Sara Nur Yildiz, however, he was originally from Baku (present-day Azerbaijan Republic), which at that time was part of the domains of the Shirvanshahs. "Kashifi" is a pseudonym he used to refer to himself in his only extant work, the Ḡazā-nāma-ye Rum. The poet wrote few details about himself; he traveled through parts of the Islamic world and lived for some time in Aleppo and Urfa (Ruha, ancient Edessa), which were then ruled by the Mamluks, but was forced to leave these areas due to political upheaval.

After a lengthy, difficult period during which he endured many hardships, Kashifi reached Constantinople, which had recently become the capital of the Ottoman Empire, where he worked for some time as a jester and minstrel, and lived in poverty. Eventually, he met Ottoman statesman and poet Ahmed Pasha (died 1496), who in 1478 arranged a meeting between Kashifi and Karamani Mehmed Pasha, the Grand Vizier. Kashifi took with him an unfinished Persian-language masnavi poem about the military exploits of Sultan Mehmed II (r. 1444–1446, 1451–1481), the Ğazā-nāma-ye Rum. The Grand Vizier presented Kashifi to Mehmed II, who was very generous towards Kashifi and invited him to stay as a poet at the royal palace. Nothing more about Kashifi's life, including the precise date of his death, is known; he died in the 15th century.

== Work ==
The Ḡazā-nāma-ye Rum is Kashifi's only extant work; the only known manuscript is stored at Istanbul University. An epic poem consisting of 1,139 couplets in the motaqareb meter, he probably wrote it for Ahmed Pasha in c. 1456 or 1478. The text narrates the life and reign of (r. 1421–1444) and Mehmed II, including the Crusade of Varna (1444) and the Battle of Kosovo (1448). The work ends abruptly with an announcement of Mehmed II's wedding with the Dulkadir (Zu'l-Qadr) princess Sittişah Hatun. It remains unknown whether the text was ever completed.

Kashifi used eyewitness accounts as references, which makes the Ḡazā-nāma-ye Rum a pivotal piece of information about contemporaneous strategy, weapons and conduct of warfare. The text is the oldest Persian work written in the style of Ferdowsi's Shahnameh during the Ottoman Empire. The work also contains several couplets from Shahnameh.

== Sources ==
- Kim, Sooyong (2019). "An Ottoman Order of Persian Verse". In Necipoğlu, Gülru; Kafadar, Cemal; Fleischer, Cornell H. (eds.). Treasures of Knowledge: An Inventory of the Ottoman Palace Library (1502/3-1503/4). Brill. pp. 635–656. doi:10.1163/9789004402508_021. ISBN 978-90-04-40250-8.
- Genç, Vural (2021). "An Iranian Shāh-nāma Writer at the Court of Bāyezid II: Malekzāda Āhi". Journal of Persianate Studies. 13 (2): 119–145. doi:10.1163/18747167-bja10009.
- Özgüdenlı, Osman G. (2011). "Kāšefi". In Yarshater, Ehsan (ed.). Encyclopædia Iranica. Vol. XV/6: Karim Khan Zand–Kašḡari, Saʿd-al-Din. London and New York: Routledge & Kegan Paul. pp. 657–658. ISBN 978-1-934283-29-5.
- Yildiz, Sara Nur (2004). "Historiography xiv. The Ottoman Empire". In Yarshater, Ehsan (ed.). Encyclopædia Iranica. Vol. XII/4: Historiography III–Homosexuality III. London and New York: Routledge & Kegan Paul. pp. 403–411. ISBN 978-0-933273-78-8.
