= Battle of Kunovica =

1444 battle in Serbia

- Part of the Crusade of Varna and the Hungarian–Ottoman Wars
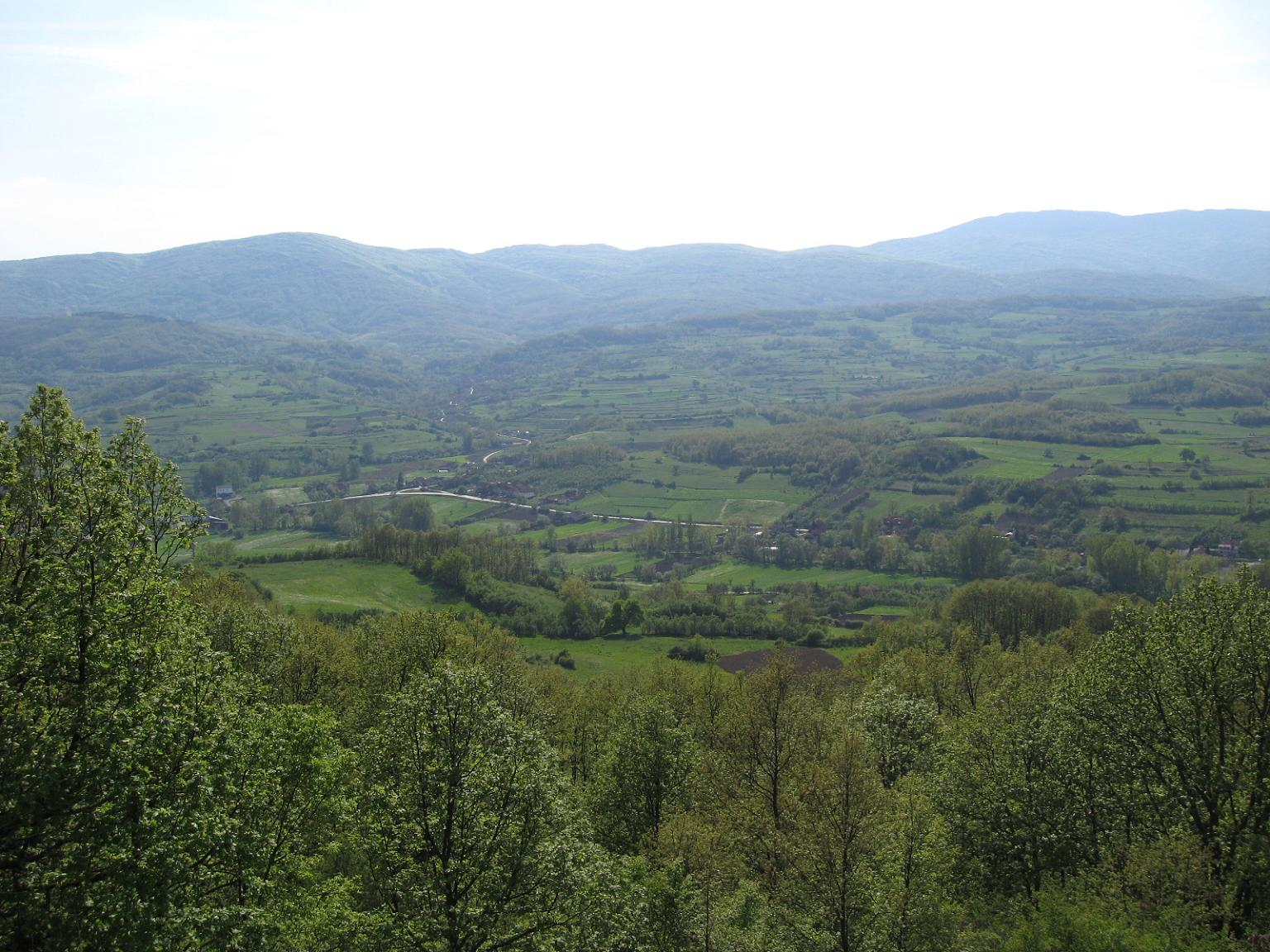
- Suva Planina
Date	2 or 5 January 1444
Location	Kunovica, between Niš and Pirot, Ottoman Empire (modern-day Serbia) 43°10′49″N 22°10′34″E
Result	Christian victory
Territorial changes	Reestablishment of Serbian Despotate

Belligerents
Kingdom of Hungary; Kingdom of Croatia; Kingdom of Poland; Serbian Despotate	Ottoman Empire

Commanders and leaders
John Hunyadi; Władysław III; Đurađ Branković; Julian Cesarini	(Ottoman Empire) Kasım Pasha (Ottoman Empire) Turahan Bey (Ottoman Empire) Mahmud Çelebi (POW)

Strength
Unknown	Unknown

Casualties and losses
Unknown	Thousands killed Many captured 170 of whom were executed

The Battle of Kunovica or Battle at Kunovitsa was fought between crusaders led by John Hunyadi and the armies of the Ottoman Empire on 2 or 5 January 1444, near the mountain Kunovica (Suva Planina) between Pirot and Niš, in present-day Serbia. It was part of the Long Campaign.

== Battle ==
Anti-Ottoman campaigns of John Hunyadi, 1440–1456

The Christian contingent began their retreat on 24 December 1443, after the Battle of Zlatica. The Ottoman forces followed them across the rivers Iskar and Nišava and in the Kunorica pass attacked (some sources say ambushed by) the rear flanks of the retreating armies composed of armies of the Serbian Despotate under command of Đurađ Branković. The battle took place during the night, under the full moon. Hunyadi and Władysław who were already through the pass left their supplies guarded by infantry and attacked Ottoman forces near the river on the eastern side of the mountain. The Ottomans were defeated and many Ottoman commanders, including Mahmud Çelebi of Çandarlı family (in some earlier sources referred to as Karambeg), were captured.

The Ottoman defeat in the Battle of Kunovica and capture of Mahmud Bey, the Sultan's son-in-law, created the impression of an overall victorious campaign. According to some sources, Skanderbeg participated in this battle on the Ottoman side and deserted Ottoman forces during the conflict.

== Aftermath ==
Four days after this battle the Christian coalition reached Prokuplje. Đurađ Branković proposed to Władysław III of Poland and John Hunyadi to stay in Serbian fortified towns during the winter and continue their campaign against the Ottomans in the spring of 1444. They rejected his proposal and retreated. By the end of January 1444 forces of Władysław and Hunyadi reached Belgrade and in February they arrived in Buda where they were greeted as heroes. During 1444 ambassadors of Christian forces were sent to Adrianople and organized signing of a ten-years long peace treaty known as the Peace of Szeged.

Contemporary Ottoman sources blame rivalry between the commanders Kasim and Turahan for the defeat at Kunovica, while some claim that the Serbian Despot Đurađ Branković bribed Turahan not to participate in the battle. Turahan fell from favour as a result and was banished by the Sultan to a prison in Tokat.

This battle is commemorated in Serbian epic song Blow, Wind (Serbian: Подухни ветре).

== Sources ==
- Mijatović, Čedomilj (1880). Despot Đurađ Branković: Od stupanja Đurđeva na vladu godine 1427 do prvog oslobođenja Srbije od turaka godine 1444. Štampano u Državnoj štampariji.
- Gegaj, Athanase (1937), L'Albanie et l'Invasion turque au XVe siècle (in French), Universite de Louvain, ISBN 9780598935991, OCLC 652265147
- Hösch, Edgar (1972). The Balkans: a short history from Greek times to the present day. Crane, Russak. ISBN 978-0-8448-0072-1.
- Babinger, Franz (1987) [1936]. "Turakhān Beg". In Houtsma, Martijn Theodoor (ed.). E.J. Brill's first encyclopaedia of Islam, 1913–1936, Volume VIII. Leiden: BRILL. ISBN 90-04-09794-5.
- Hussey, Joan Mervyn (1966). The Cambridge Medieval History. University Press.
- Jireček, Konstantin (1978). Istorija Srba. Slovo ljubve.
- Setton, Kenneth M.; Hazard, Harry W.; Zacour, Norman P. (1990). A History of the Crusades: The Impact of the Crusades on Europe. Univ of Wisconsin Press. ISBN 978-0-299-10744-4.
- Babinger, Franz (1992) [1978]. Mehmed the Conqueror and His Time. Bollingen Series 96. Translated from the German by Ralph Manheim. Edited, with a preface, by William C. Hickman. Princeton, New Jersey: Princeton University Press. ISBN 0-691-09900-6.
- Imber, Colin (2006). The Crusade of Varna, 1443–45. Aldershot: Ashgate Publishing. ISBN 978-0-7546-0144-9.
- Imber, Colin (2006a). "Introduction" (PDF). The Crusade of Varna, 1443–45. Aldershot, England; Burlington, VT: Ashgate Publishing. pp. 9–31. ISBN 978-0-7546-0144-9. Archived from the original (PDF) on 2007-06-28.
- Mirčetić, Dragoljub (1994). Vojna istorija Niša: deo 1. Od najstarijih vremena do prvog srpskog ustanka. deo 2. U sredjem veku (700-1459). deo 3. U razdoblju Turske vlasti (1459-1878). Prosveta. ISBN 9788774551522.
- Olejnik, Karol (1996). Władysław III Warneńczyk: 1424-1444 (in Polish). Wydawn. Archiwum Państwowego "Dokument" w Szczecinie. ISBN 978-83-86992-10-2.
- Ćorović, Vladimir (2014). Istorija srpskog naroda. eBook Portal. GGKEY:XPENWQLDTZF.
