= Svishtiplaz =

Coordinates: 42°45′55″N 24°6′46″E

Svishtiplaz (Bulgarian: Свищиплаз, "windy place") is a Bulgarian mountain peak located in the Stara Planina range just north of Zlatitsa. The peak's elevation is 1888m above sea level. A nearby mountain hut is named after the mountain.
