= Khonsari =

Khonsari or Khonsary (Persian: خوانساری; related to Khvansar or Khvansar County in Isfahan Province, Iran) is a Persian language surname which can also be found among the Iranian diaspora. Notable people with the surname include:

- Ahmad Khonsari (1887–1985), Iranian Grand Ayatollah
- Mehrdad Khonsari (born 1949), Iranian diplomat and politician
- Michael M. Khonsari (born 19??), American mechanical engineer
- Navid Khonsari (born 1970), Iranian-Canadian video game, film and graphic novel creator, writer, director and producer

== See also ==
- Khansari, another transcription of the same Iranian surname
- Khonsary, another transcription of the same Iranian surname
