= Battle of Nish (1443) =

Battle of 1443 between Christian Alliance and Ottoman Empire

- Part of the Crusade of Varna and the Hungarian–Ottoman Wars
Date	2 or 3 November 1443
Location	near Niš, Bulgaria
Result	Crusader victory

Belligerents
Kingdom of Hungary; Kingdom of Croatia; Kingdom of Poland; Serbian Despotate	Ottoman Empire

Commanders and leaders
John Hunyadi	(Ottoman Empire) Kasım Pasha (Ottoman Empire) Turahan Bey (Ottoman Empire) Ishak Bey (Ottoman Empire) Skanderbeg (Ottoman Empire) Hamza Kastrioti

Strength
12,000 cavalry	12,000 sipahi cavalry under direct command of Kasım Beg; Frontier army of unknown number

Casualties and losses
500	6,000: 2,000 killed; 4,000 captured; Skanderbeg and 300 Albanian cavalrymen deserted; Many more during retreat; 13 high rank prisoners (Note: Kese Viddini and Omar, the beys of Sofia, Timurtas' son Ali, the bey of Sumla, Balaban Pasha of Tokat, Kasim Pasha, the beyler bey of Rumelia, and the beys of Kursolch and Kojvanov named Zhivan, in addition to Hamza Beg of Beze, Isaac Beg of Philippopolis, Dan Beg of Zetnice and bey of Boli, not least Kapus Beg, the sultan's chancellor, and finally Chalil Pasha.)

The Battle of Nish (early November 1443) was fought between the Crusaders led by John Hunyadi and Đurađ Branković and the Ottoman Empire led by Kasım Pasha. It saw the Crusaders capture the Ottoman stronghold of Nish (Niš) in Serbia, and defeat two armies of the Ottoman Empire. The Battle of Nish was part of Hunyadi's expedition known as the long campaign. Hunyadi, at the head of the vanguard, crossed the Balkans through the Gate of Trajan, captured Nish, defeated three Ottoman pashas, and after taking Sofia from the Ottomans, united with the royal army and defeated Sultan Murad II at Snaim (Kustinitza). The impatience of the king and the severity of the winter then compelled him (in February 1444) to return home.

== Background ==
In 1440 John Hunyadi became the trusted adviser and most highly regarded soldier of king Władysław III of Poland. Hunyadi was rewarded with the captaincy of the fortress of Belgrade and was put in charge of military operations against the Ottomans. King Władysław recognized Hunyadi's merits by granting him estates in Eastern Hungary. Hunyadi soon showed and displayed an extraordinary capacity to marshal his defences with the limited resources at his disposal. He was victorious in Semendria over Ishak-Beg in 1441. Not far from Nagyszeben in Transylvania he annihilated an Ottoman force and recovered for Hungary the suzerainty of Wallachia. The Crusader army consisted of 25,000 or more troops and 600 war wagons. Hunyadi took 12,000 cavalry to locate and defeat Kasım Pasha. Władysław and Brankovic were left in camp with the war wagons.

== Battle ==
The battle for Nish was not one, but five different battles. The first engagement was a battle against a small garrison in Nish and the Crusaders captured, pillaged, and burned the town. This was followed by three battles against three different Ottoman armies advancing on Nish. Finally there was one against the remnants of the three Ottoman armies.

The last battle took place on the plain between Bolvan and Nish on 3 November 1443. Ottoman forces were led by Kasım Pasha, the beglerbeg of Rumelia, Turahan Beg and Ishak-Beg. After the Ottoman defeat, the retreating forces of Kasım Pasha and Turahan Beg burned all of the villages between Nish and Sofia. The Ottoman sources explain the Ottoman defeat as due to a lack of cooperation between the different Ottoman armies which were led by different commanders.

== Aftermath ==
According to Chalcocondyles, "Weary after Hunyadi forced the Ottomans to retreat in the Balkans in 1443, the old lords hurried on all sides to regain possession of their fathers' fields". One of them was Gjergj Kastrioti Skanderbeg who deserted the Ottoman army along with his nephew Hamza Kastrioti and 300 Albanians and after capturing Krujë started a twenty-five-year-long struggle against the Ottoman Empire.

Murad II signed a treaty for ten years, and abdicated in favour of his son Mehmed II. When the peace was broken the next year, Murad returned to the Balkans and won the Battle of Varna in November 1444.
