= Khaneh Sar, East Azerbaijan =

Khaneh Sar خانه سر
- Village
- Location within Iran
- Coordinates: 38°42′18″N 45°54′38″E
- Country: Iran
- Province: East Azerbaijan
- County: Marand
- Bakhsh: Central
- Rural District: Harzandat-e Sharqi

Population (2006)
  - Total: 106
- Time zone: UTC+3:30 (IRST)
  - Summer (DST): UTC+4:30 (IRDT)

Khaneh Sar (Persian: خانه سر, also Romanized as Khāneh Sar) is a village in Harzandat-e Sharqi Rural District, in the Central District of Marand County, East Azerbaijan Province, Iran. At the 2006 census, its population was 106, in 30 families.
