= Leon Koen =

Serbian painter (1859–1934)

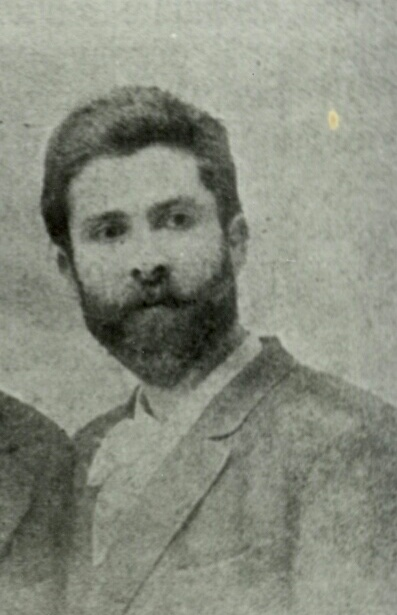
- A photo of Koen
- Born: 1859; Belgrade, Principality of Serbia
- Died: 1934 (aged 74–75); Vršac, Kingdom of Yugoslavia (aged 75)
- Movement: Symbolism
- Awards: Silver medal for painting by the Munich Academy of Fine Arts

Leon Koen (Serbian Cyrillic: Леон Коен; 1859–1934) was a Serbian painter. Despite participating in major exhibitions, only a fraction of his works are known to survive.

== Biography ==
Leon Koen was born to a Sephardi Jewish family of merchants Aaron and mother Sarah, in Belgrade, Principality of Serbia. In 1884, he enrolled in a preparatory course at the Munich Academy of Fine Arts, and the following year he received a state scholarship from Kingdom of Serbia and enrolled in the Academy, whose alumni include Đorđe Krstić and Stevan Aleksić.

In 1889, he exhibited at the Exposition Universelle in Paris, and six years later at the Venice Biennale. In 1896 he was awarded the silver medal for painting "Joseph's Dream" by the Munich Academy of Fine Arts.

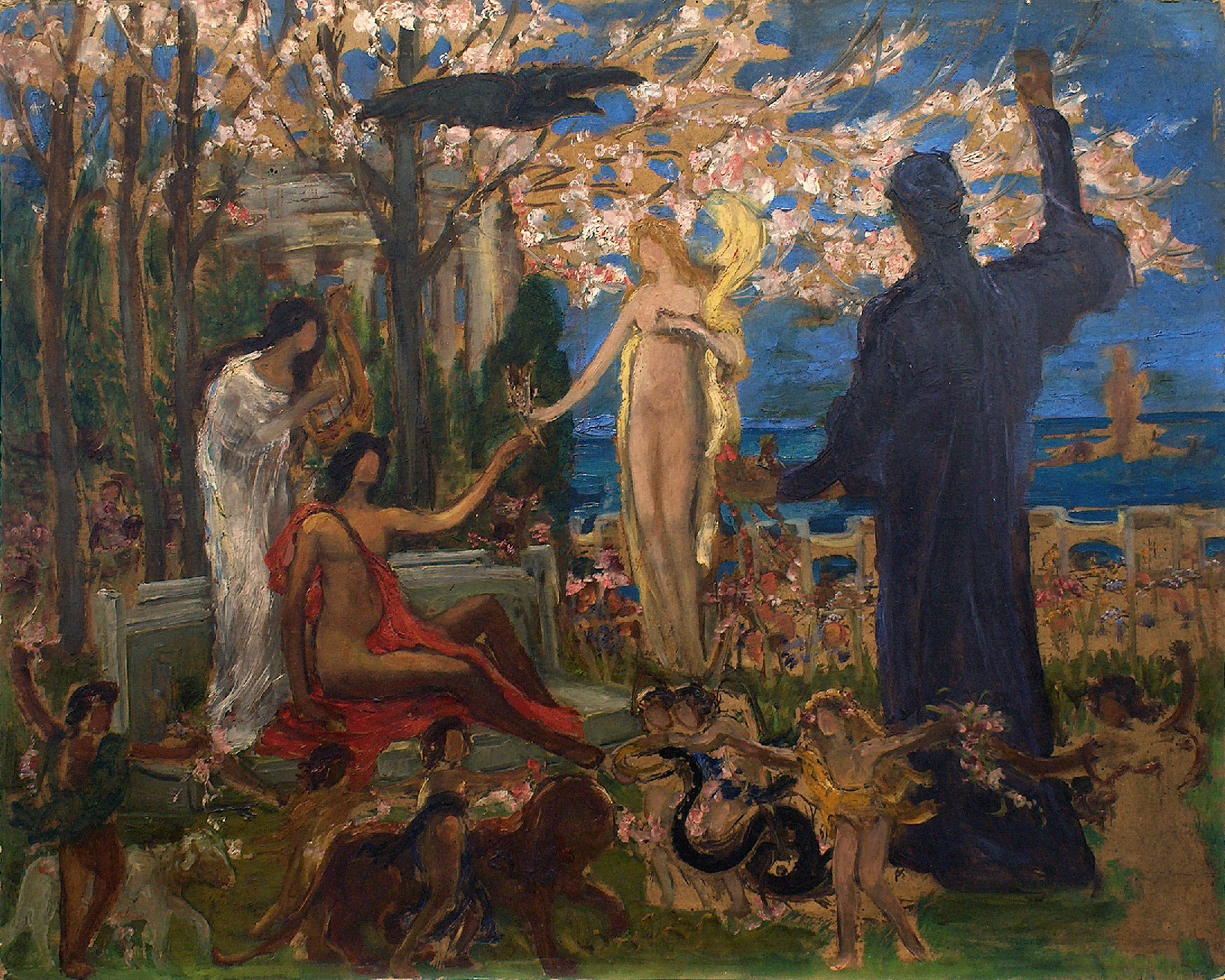
Spring by Koen, 1902, National Museum of Serbia

Koen survived a nervous breakdown in 1902 and was placed in a mental hospital in Belgrade, where he was under constant psychiatric supervision until his death. The deterioration of his mental health forced his wife, Josephine Simon, to sell most of his paintings. Koen's close friend, David Pijade, collected his paintings for a major retrospective that took place in 1926 at King Peter's School near St. Michael's Cathedral in Belgrade. He frequently painted works inspired by history of Serbia and nature.

One year after Koen's death a grand retrospective was held at the Cvijeta Zuzorić Art Pavilion in Kalemegdan. The exhibition featured 63 works.

He was in correspondence and associated with Nadežda Petrović, Vasily Kandinsky and Franz Stuck. Koen's work was praised by fellow painter Đorđe Krstić. Only fifteen of Koen's paintings survive. Most of his painting were lost or destroyed during the Second World War. Twelve surviving works are in the collection of the National Museum of Serbia, and two more are owned by The Federation of Jewish Communities of Serbia.

== See also ==
- List of Serbian painters
