= History of the Crusades =

History of the Crusades may refer to:

- the historiography of the Crusades
- Voltaire, Histoire des Croisades (1750, 1751)
- Charles Mills, History of the Crusades for the Recovery and Possession of the Holy Land (1820)
- Joseph François Michaud, Histoire des Croisades (1811-1840)
- René Grousset, L'Histoire des croisades et du royaume franc de Jérusalem, 3 vols. (1934–1936)
- Steven Runciman, A History of the Crusades (1951-54);
- Christopher Tyerman, God's War: A New History of the Crusades (2006).
