= Khansar, Yazd =

Khvansar Harat خوانسار
- Village
- Location within Iran
- Coordinates: 29°55′48″N 54°07′22″E
- Country: Iran
- Province: Yazd
- County: Khatam
- Bakhsh: Central
- Rural District: Fathabad

Population (2006)
  - Total: 329
- Time zone: UTC+3:30 (IRST)
  - Summer (DST): UTC+4:30 (IRDT)

Khvansar (Persian: خوانسار, also Romanized as Khvānsār; also known as Khānsār) is a village in Fathabad Rural District, in the Central District of Khatam County, Yazd Province, Iran. At the 2006 census, its population was 329, in 96 families.
