= Philippopolis =

Philippopolis (Greek: Φιλιππούπολη) may refer to several cities named after Philip II, Philip V, or Philip the Arab:

- Philippopolis in Arabia, a former name of Shahba, Syria
- Philippopolis in Thessaly, a former name of Gomfoi, Greece
- Phthiotic Thebes or Philippopolis in Thessaly, a former city in Greece
- Philippopolis in Thrace, a former name of Plovdiv, Bulgaria
  - Council of Philippopolis, a synod held in 343, 344 or 347
  - Roman Catholic titular see of Philippopolis in Thracia
  - Duchy of Philippopolis, a crusader state established in 1204

== See also ==
- Battle of Philippopolis (disambiguation)
