= Seyed Ali Kashefi Khansari =

Iranian writer

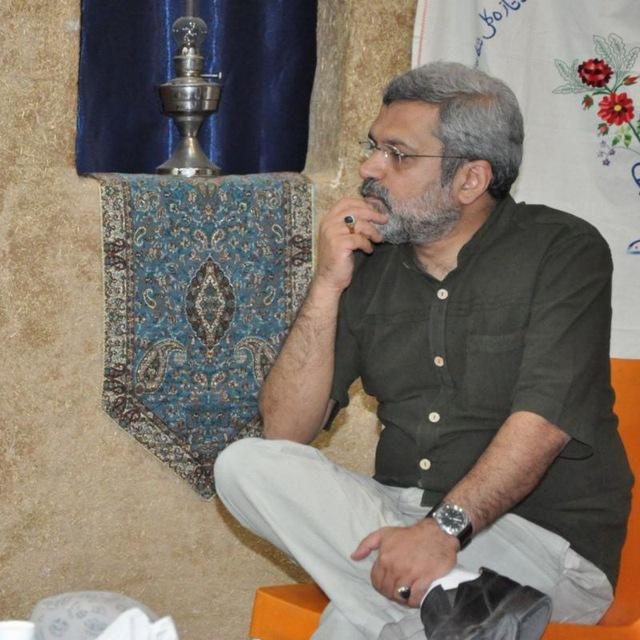
- Born: 11 February 1972 (age 54); Tehran
- Occupations: Children's writer, poet, literary critic, and journalist.
- Children: Saleh Kashefi
- Website: alikashefi.com

Seyed Ali Kashefi Khansari (Persian: سید علی کاشفی خوانساری; born 11 February 1972, in Tehran) is an Iranian children's writer and editor-in-chief of Iranian children literature magazine Soroush Nojavan.

== Life ==
Seyyed Ali Kashefi Khansari was born in 1972, Tehran. When he was 20 years old he officially started working as a journalist. He has written more than a hundred articles and more than 200 statement about Children's Literature. There is 95 published books written by him which are usually about the criticism and the history of Children's Literature and Publications. He has received 16 awards for his works.

He has also worked in many NGO's and public organizations, having responsibilities in the topic of Literature, Theater and Press. He has held many conferences in international festivals and exhibitions held in 19 different countries like Spain, Germany, India, Indonesia and Lebanon.He has worked as the Chief Editor of 15 magazines which the best known of them are Children & Young Adults’ Quarterly Book Review and also Shahrzad, a monthly magazine about childhood & parenthood.

== Selected works ==
The following is a selection of the author's published books.

- Nashriyyāt-e Koodak va Nojavān-e Irān [Children’s and Young Adult Periodicals in Iran] (1996), Khaneh-ye Rooznameh-negaran-e Javan.
- Kamāl al-Molk [Kamal al-Molk] (1997), Tā 14.
- Chehreh-hā-ye Adabiyāt-e Koodak [Prominent Figures in Children’s Literature] (18-volume series, 1999–2001), Roozgar.
- Be Ehte rā m-e Āftāb [In Honour of the Sun] (2000), Mouood. (Three printings.)
- Chand Maqāleh-ye Nazari Darbāreh-ye Matbooāt-e Koodak va Nojavān [Theoretical Essays on Children’s and Young Adult Periodicals] (2001), Soroush.
- Davāhā-ye Adabi [Literary Disputes] (2001), Enteshārāt-e Madreseh.
- Mehmān [The Guest] (2002), Qoo.
- Va Inak Zamin [And Now, the Earth] (2002), Quran Exhibition.
- Fehrestegān-e Namāyesh-e Koodak va Nojavān [Catalogue of Children’s and Young Adult Theatre] (2003), Namāyesh.
- Roozi Roozegāri Cinema [Once Upon a Time: Cinema] (2003), Neyestān.
- Az Bāb-e Qerā’at-e Atfāl [On Reading for Children] (2003), Qadyani.
- Heydar-nāmeh [The Haydarnameh] (2003), Mouood.
- Gozaresh-e Tahlili-ye Naqd-e Adabiyāt-e Koodak va Nojavān [An Analytical Report on Criticism of Children’s and Young Adult Literature] (2004), Ketāb-e Tāhā, Qom.
- Aroosak-hā-ye Khodā [God’s Dolls] (2004), Dāstānsarā.
- Āshenāyi bā Nafs al-Homum [An Introduction to Nafs al-Homum] (2005), Institute for the Intellectual Development of Children and Young Adults.
- Hajj-nāmeh-hā [Hajj Narratives] (2005), Ketāb-e Tāhā, Qom.
- Hamleh-khāni va Hamleh-sarāyi [The Recitation and Performance of Hamleh] (2006), Havā.
- Āyatollāh Borujerdi [Ayatollah Borujerdi] (2006), Madreseh.
- Bābā-ye Sooreh [The Father of the Surah] (2007), Monādi-ye Tarbiyat.
- Parseh [Wandering] (2007), Havā.
- Sorudeh-hā-ye Pas az Marg [Poems after Death] (2008), Havā.
- Dar Bāb-e Tooyi [On Being Yours] (2008), Havā.
- Qesseh-ye Rooznameh-jāt-e Ahd-e Booq [Tales of Newspapers from Bygone Days] (2008), Havā.
- Mozāheman [Troublemakers] (young adult fiction, 2008), Monādi-ye Tarbiyat.
- Tārikh-e Adabiyāt-e Dini-ye Koodak va Nojavān [A History of Religious Children’s and Young Adult Literature] (2009), Havā.
- Ān Keh Raft, Ān Keh Nayāmad [The One Who Left and the One Who Never Came] (poetry, 2009), Nashr-e Qesseh.
- Shāhnāmeh-hā-ye Koodakāneh [Children’s Shahnamehs] (2009), Havā.
- Koodakān va Shāhnāmeh [Children and the Shahnameh] (2009), Havā.
- Lālāyi-hā-ye Lālayilāyi [Lullabies of Lalilay] (poetry, 2009), Panjgah.
- Farand va Judy [Fred and Judy] (in English, 2009), Nashr-e Ou.
- Zendegināmeh-ye Sāheb-e Javāher [Biography of the Author of Jawaher] (2011), Enteshārāt-e Madreseh.
- Pir-mard Mādar-am Bood [My Mother Was an Old Man] (poetry, 2013), Sagorsstad, Sweden.
- Mehmān-e Koochak [The Little Guest] (2013), Amirkabir.
- Dokhtarān Dar Adabiyāt-e Koodakān [Girls in Children’s Literature] (2014), Havā.
- Aroosak-hā-ye Khodā [God’s Dolls] (2014), Havā.
- Haft Ketāb, Chand Porsesh [Seven Books, Several Questions] (2014), Havā.
- Nashriyyāt-e Koodak va Nojavān [Children’s and Young Adult Periodicals] (2014), Havā.
- Sandookcheh-ye Omid [The Hope Chest] (young adult novel, 2014), Bimeh.
- Qesseh-ye Cinema-jāt-e Ahd-e Booq [Tales of Cinema from Bygone Days] (2015), Farabi Cinema Foundation and Havā.
- Nazar bar Nazar [Opinion upon Opinion] (2016), Khaneh-ye Ketāb.
- Geryeh-hā-ye Dotāyi [Double Tears] (2016), Havā.
- Qesseh-hā-ye Doost-dāshtani, Vol. 1 [Beloved Stories] (2016), Qadyani.
- Qesseh-hā-ye Doost-dāshtani, Vol. 2 [Beloved Stories] (2016), Qadyani.
- Yāddāsht-hā-ye Yek Safar-e Gheyr-e Qānuni [Notes from an Illegal Journey] (2017), Ehya.
- Agar Fereshteh-hā Khandideh Boodan [If Only the Angels Had Laughed] (2017), Hezāreh-ye Qoqnoos.
- Ta’dib al-Atfāl [The Discipline of Children] (2017), Madreseh.
- Manba’-shenāsi-ye Cinema-ye Koodak va Nojavān [A Bibliography of Children’s and Young Adult Cinema] (2018), Aron.
- Khāk va Nāpāk [Pure and Impure Soil] (2019), Sāyeh-Gostar.
- Ketāb-e Ali [The Book of Ali] (2019), Madreseh.
- Maqāleh-shenāsi-ye Cinema-ye Koodak [An Article Bibliography of Children’s Cinema] (2019), Aron.
- Matbooāt-e Koodak va Nojavān Dar Jomhuri-ye Eslāmi-ye Irān [Children’s and Young Adult Periodicals in the Islamic Republic of Iran] (2019), Aron.
- Adabiyāt-e Koodak va Nojavān Dar Sāl-e 1400 [Children’s and Young Adult Literature in 2021] (2022), Aron.
- Do Dokhtar-e Palangi [Two Leopard Girls] (2022), Siavashan.
- Meftāh al-Molk [Miftah al-Molk] (2022), Gooya.
- Khāndani-hā-ye Nobāvagān-e Irān, Vol. 2 [Reading Materials for Iran’s Youngest Children] (2025), Jahan-e Ketāb.
- Khāndani-hā-ye Nobāvagān-e Irān, Vol. 3 [Reading Materials for Iran’s Youngest Children] (2026), Jahan-e Ketāb.
- Kholāsat al-Tavārikh [A Summary of Histories] (2026), Mohajer.
- Shahrzād: Gāh-nāmeh-ye Motāle’āt-e Qesseh-gooyi [Shahrzad: A Periodical of Storytelling Studies] (2026), Cheshmeh.
- Az Bāb-e Qerā’at-e Atfāl, 2nd ed. [On Reading for Children] (2026), Farāham.
- Hooshang Morādi Kermāni [Houshang Moradi Kermani] (2026), Geh-Gāh.
