= Kasım Pasha =

- Kasım Paşa
- Military career
- Allegiance: Ottoman Empire
- Rank: beylerbey
- Conflicts: Battle of Niš; Battle of Zlatica; Battle of Melstica

Kasım Pasha or Kasim Pasha (Turkish: Kasım Paşa; fl. 1442–43) was an Ottoman Albanian general and governor, the beylerbey of Rumelia and one of the commanders of the Ottoman forces during the Crusade of Varna (1443–44). He is a descendant of both the Arianiti and Muzaka families and of Todor Muzaka directly.

When Rumelian beylerbey and vizier Hadım Şehabeddin was defeated by John Hunyadi in 1442, he was replaced by Kasım Pasha at both positions.

== Crusade of Varna ==
At the beginning of the Crusade of Varna John Hunyadi crossed the Danube and rushed south along the river Morava to attack forces of Kasım Pasha before he could mobilize his complete army. The cavalry forces of 12,000 Sipahis commanded by Kasım Pasha were defeated near Aleksinac during the Battle of Niš in 1443. After an Ottoman defeat, the retreating forces of Kasım Pasha and Turahan Bey burned all villages between Niš and Sofia. Turakhan Bey and Kasım Pasha met each other again in Sofia from where Kasım sent the messenger to Edirne to alert Sultan.

Kasım Pasha commanded Ottoman forces that chased Christian army after the Battle of Zlatica held at the end of 1443. His army was defeated on 24 December 1444 on Melštica near Sofija and many Ottoman officers were captured by Christian army.

There was a big mutual animosity between Kasım and Turahan and some Ottoman sources blame Turahan for Kasım's defeat at Melštica claiming that Serbian Despot Branković bribed Turahan not to participate in the battle which ended with the defeat of his rival, Kasım.

When the Sultan banished Turahan Bey to a prison, Kasım allegedly complained to Çandarlı Halil Pasha that Turahan Bey's subordinated officers should be banished too. When his complaint was refused, Kasım resigned from the position of Rumelia beylerbey.

== Sources ==
- Jefferson, John (2012). The Holy Wars of King Wladislas and Sultan Murad: The Ottoman-Christian Conflict from 1438-1444. BRILL. ISBN 978-90-04-21904-5.

Political offices
Preceded by Hadım Şehabeddin	Beylerbey of the Rumelia Eyalet; 1442 — 1442	Succeeded by unknown
