= Crusade of Varna =

1443–44 unsuccessful campaign by Europeans against the Ottoman Empire

- Part of the Hungarian–Ottoman Wars and the Crusades
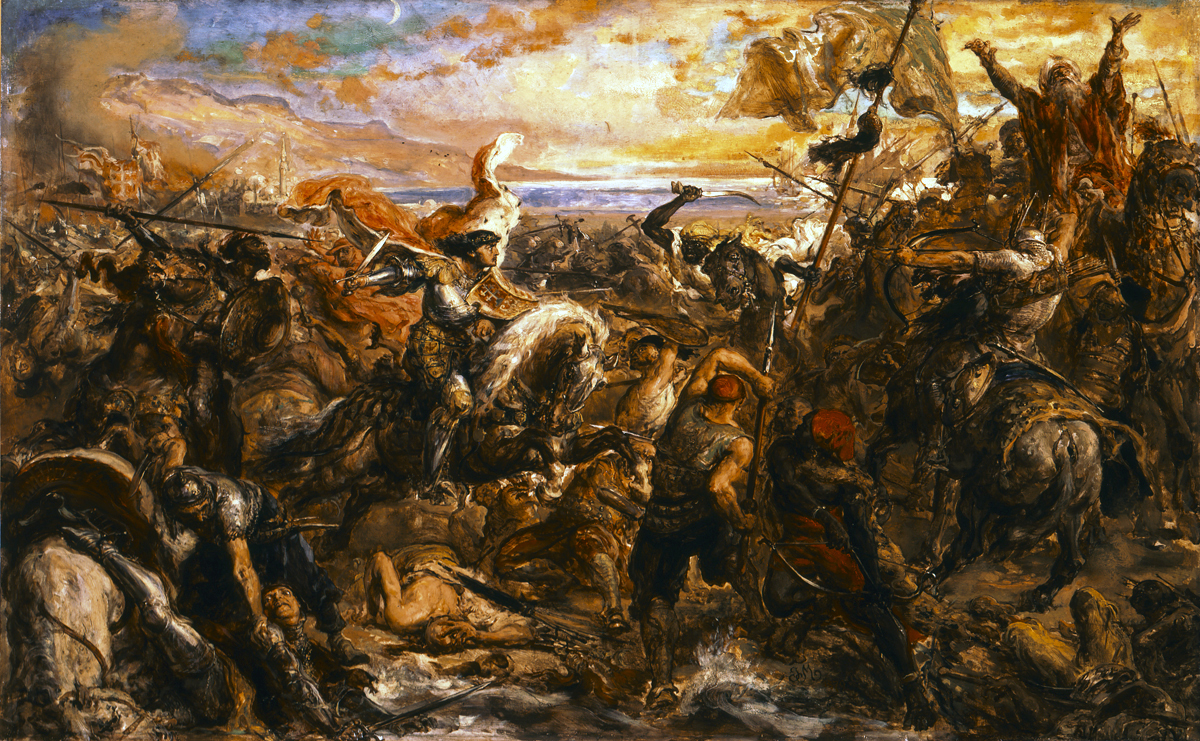
- King Władysław III of Poland in the Battle of Varna, by Jan Matejko
Date	October 1443 – November 1444
Location	Southern Europe (Balkans)
Result	Ottoman victory

Belligerents
Kingdom of Hungary; Kingdom of Croatia; Kingdom of Poland; Serbian Despotate; Principality of Wallachia; Teutonic Order; Supported by: Grand Duchy of Lithuania; Duchy of Burgundy; Republic of Venice; Byzantine Empire; Papal States	Ottoman Empire

Commanders and leaders
Władysław III (MIA); John Hunyadi; Đurađ Branković (Wallachia) Mircea II; Julian Cesarini †	(Ottoman Empire) Murad II (Ottoman Empire) Mehmed II

The Crusade of Varna was an unsuccessful military campaign mounted by several European leaders to check the expansion of the Ottoman Empire into Central Europe, specifically the Balkans between 1443 and 1444. It was called by Pope Eugene IV on 1 January 1443 and led by King Władysław III of Poland, John Hunyadi, Voivode of Transylvania, and Duke Philip the Good of Burgundy.

The Crusade of Varna culminated in a decisive Ottoman victory over the crusader alliance at the Battle of Varna on 10 November 1444, during which Władysław disappeared and the expedition's papal legate Julian Cesarini was killed.

== Background ==
Anti-Ottoman Campaigns of John Hunyadi, 1440–1456

In 1428, while the Ottoman Empire was fighting a war with the Republic of Venice and the Kingdom of Hungary they achieved a temporary peace by establishing the Serbian Despotate as a buffer state. After the war ended in 1430, the Ottomans returned to their earlier objective of controlling all lands south of the Danube. In 1432, Sultan Murad II began raiding into Transylvania. After King Sigismund died in 1437, the attacks intensified, with the Ottomans occupying Borač in 1438 and Zvornik and Srebrenica in 1439. At the end of 1439, Smederevo capitulated and Murad succeeded in making Serbia an Ottoman province. Đurađ Branković, Despot of Serbia, fled to his estates in Hungary. In 1440, Murad besieged Hungary's main border fortress, Belgrade. After failing to take the fortress, he was forced to return to Anatolia to stop attacks by the Karamanids.

Meanwhile, Sigismund's successor Albert had died in October 1439, shortly after signing a law to "restore the ancient laws and customs of the realm". The law restricted the royal authority by requiring the participation of landed nobility in political decisions. Four months after Albert's death, his only son Ladislaus the Posthumous was born while Hungary was in the midst of a civil war over the next monarch. On 17 July 1440, Władysław, king of Poland, was crowned despite continuing disputes. John Hunyadi aided Władysław's cause by pacifying the eastern counties, gaining him the position of Nádor of Transylvania and the corresponding responsibility of protecting Hungary's southern border. By the end of 1442, Władysław had secured his status in Hungary, and rejected an Ottoman proposal of peace in exchange for Belgrade.

The Catholic Church had long been advocating for a crusade against the Ottomans, and with the end of both the Hungarian civil war and a nearly simultaneous one in Byzantium, they were able to begin negotiations and planning realistically. The impetus required to turn the plans into action was provided by Hunyadi between 1441–1442. In 1441, he defeated a raid led by Ishak Pasha of Smederevo. He nearly annihilated Mezid Bey's army in Transylvania on 22 March 1442, and in September he defeated the revenge attack of Şihabeddin Pasha, governor-general of Rumelia. Branković, hoping to liberate Serbia, also lent his support after Novo Brdo, the last major Serbian city, fell to the Ottomans in 1441.

== Crusade ==
=== Early fighting ===
On 1 January 1443, Pope Eugene IV published a crusading bull. In early May, it was reported "that the Turks were in a bad state and that it would be easy to expel them from Europe". War was proclaimed against Sultan Murad II at the diet of Buda on Palm Sunday 1443, and with an army of 40,000 men, mostly Magyars, the young monarch, with Hunyadi commanding under him, crossed the Danube and took Nish and Sofia.

The crusaders, led by Władysław, Hunyadi, and Branković, attacked in mid-October. They correctly expected that Murad would not be able quickly to mobilize his army, which consisted mainly of fief-holding cavalrymen (timariots) who needed to collect the harvest to pay taxes. Hunyadi's experience of winter campaigns from 1441–1442 added to the Hungarians' advantage. They also had better armor, often rendering the Ottoman weapons useless. Murad could not rely on the loyalty of his troops from Rumelia, and had difficulties countering Hungarian tactics.

=== Battle of Nish ===
In the Battle of Nish the crusaders were victorious and forced Kasim Pasha of Rumelia and his co-commander Turahan Bey to flee to Sofia, Bulgaria to warn Murad of the invasion. However, the two burned all the villages in their path in an attempt to wear down the crusaders with a scorched earth tactic. When they arrived in Sofia, they advised the Sultan to burn the city and retreat to the mountain passes beyond, where the Ottoman's smaller army would not be such a disadvantage.

=== Battle of Aleksinac ===
After the Battle of Nish, Hunyadi and his men took a rest in a camp near the town of Aleksinac. They were informed by scouts that the Ottomans were trying to attack the king's camp by outflanking Hunyadi. This forced Hunyadi to stand against the Ottomans, who outnumbered his men, which made him doubt his chance of victory. However, he boosted his men’s morale and beat the enemy, killing 2,000 and capturing 4,000 Ottomans in the process.

=== Battle of Zlatitsa ===
Shortly after, bitter cold set in, and the next encounter, fought at Zlatitsa Pass on 12 December 1443, was fought in the snow. Until the Battle of Zlatitsa the crusaders did not meet a major Ottoman army, but only town garrisons along their route toward Adrianople. Finally, at Zlatitsa they met strong and well positioned defence forces of the Ottoman army. The crusaders were defeated.

As they marched home, however, they ambushed and defeated a pursuing force in the Battle of Kunovica, where Mahmud Bey, son-in-law of the Sultan and brother of the Grand Vizier Çandarlı Halil Pasha, was taken prisoner. Four days after this battle the Christian coalition reached Prokuplje. Branković proposed to Władysław and Hunyadi that they stay in Serbian fortified towns during the winter and continue their campaign against the Ottomans in Spring 1444. They rejected his proposal, and retreated. By the end of January 1444 forces of Władysław and Hunyadi reached Belgrade, and in February they arrived at Buda where they were greeted as heroes.

While the battle at Zlatitsa Pass had been a defeat, the ambush returned to the crusaders the impression of an overall Christian victory, and they returned triumphant. The King and Church were both anxious to maintain this impression, and gave instructions to spread word of the victories, but contradict anyone who mentioned the loss.

Murad, meanwhile, returned angry and dejected by the unreliability of his forces, and imprisoned Turahan after blaming him for the army's setbacks and Mahmud Bey's capture.

=== Peace proposals ===
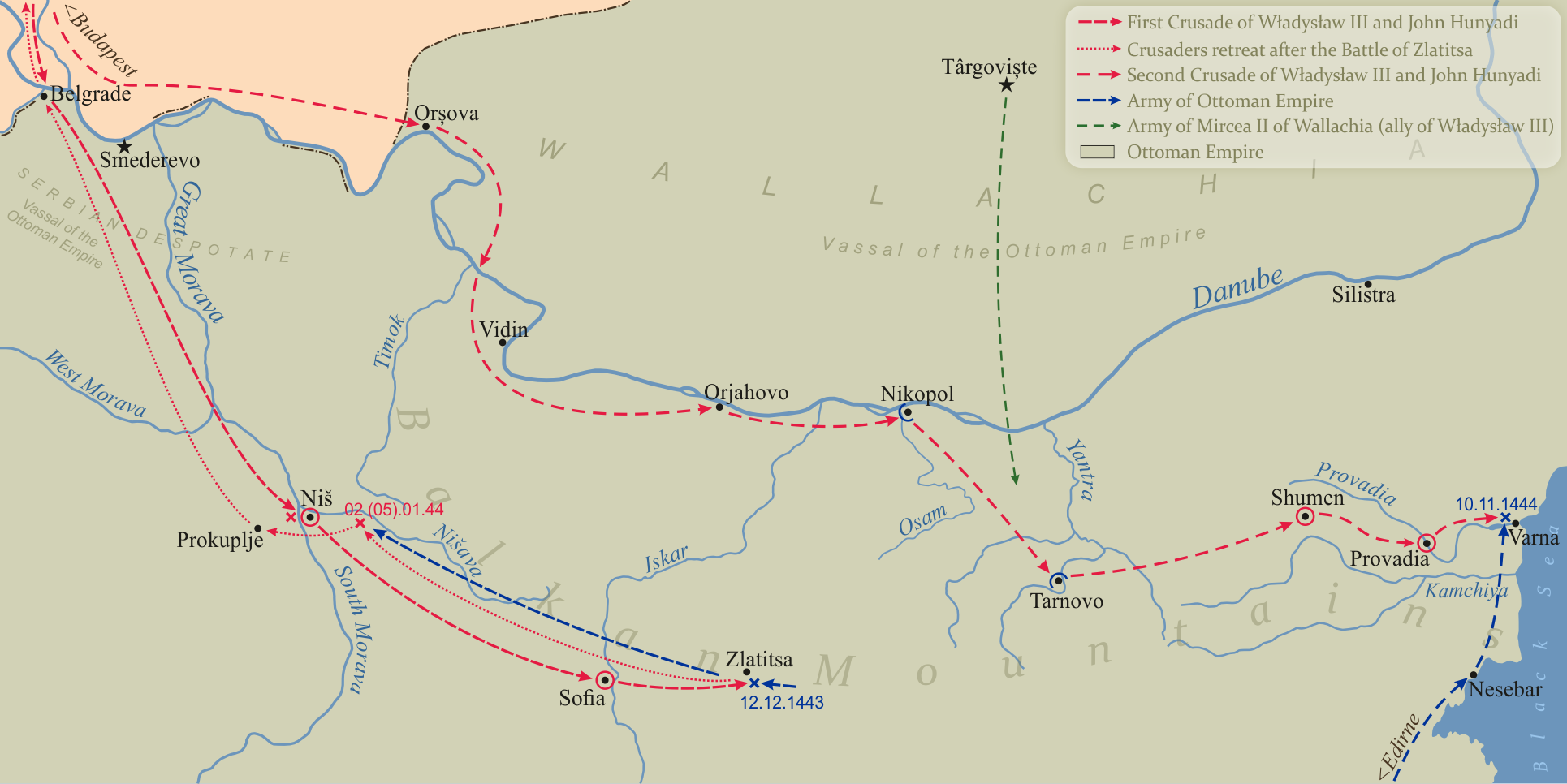
Map of the crusades of Władysław III of Poland; and Janos Hunyadi

Murad is believed to have had the greatest wish for peace. Among other things, his vizier's sister begged him to obtain her husband Mahmud's release, and his wife Mara, daughter of Đurađ Branković, added additional pressure. On 6 March 1444 Mara sent an envoy to Branković; their discussion started the peace negotiations with the Ottoman Empire.

On 24 April 1444, Władysław sent a letter to Murad, stating that his ambassador, Stojka Gisdanić, was travelling to Edirne with full powers to negotiate on his behalf. He asked that, once an agreement was reached, Murad send his own ambassadors with the treaty and his sworn oath to Hungary, at which point Władysław could also swear.

That same day, Władysław held a Diet at Buda, where he swore before Cardinal Julian Cesarini to lead a new expedition against the Ottomans in the summer. The strongest remaining supporter of Ladislaus the Posthumous' claim for the throne also agreed to a truce, thus removing the danger of another civil war.

Between June and August 1444, negotiations for a treaty were carried out, first in Edirne, and then in Szeged. The crusaders were not entirely interested in peace, however, especially with Cesarini pushing for the crusade's continuation. The Cardinal eventually found a solution that would allow for both the continuation of fighting and the ratification of the treaty, and on 15 August 1444 the Peace of Szeged was sworn into effect.

=== Final stage ===
Shortly after all the short-term requirements of the treaty were fulfilled, the Hungarians and their allies resumed the crusade. King Władysław gathered an army composed mostly of Hungarian regular troops, and forces from Poland, Transylvania, Croatia, Bosnia, heavy cavalry units from western Europe, and mercenaries from eastern Europe. The combined armies numbered 16,000, and were joined by 4,000 Wallachians in the area of Nicopolis. Murad, who had retired shortly after the treaty was completed, was called back to lead the Ottoman army. On 10 November 1444, the two armies clashed at the Battle of Varna (near the Black Sea fortress of Varna, Bulgaria). The Ottomans won a decisive victory despite heavy losses, while the crusaders lost King Władysław and over 15,000 men.

The King's ultimate fate is unknown; according to the three Turkish chroniclers he was beheaded by Ottoman mercenary, however Murad II's memorandum says the King was taken prisoner and executed later. The fallen monarch's body was never found nor presented by Ottomans, and his supposed death at the hands of the Janissary was not witnessed by any of his Polish or Hungarian men, leaving uncertainty about his ultimate fate and unconfirmed rumors about his survival; Władysław was eventually assumed to have been killed in the battle, as he did not return to any of his kingdoms.

== Aftermath ==
Many of the Crusaders were crippled by frostbite, many more died in smaller follow-up battles, and many Europeans were captured. Hungary fell back into civil war until Hunyadi was elected Regent for the infant Ladislaus in June 1446. Branković retained control over Serbia.

The Ottoman victory in Varna, followed by their victory in the Second Battle of Kosovo in 1448, deterred the European states from sending substantial military assistance to the Byzantines during the Ottoman conquest of Constantinople in 1453. Although Pius II officially declared a three-year crusade at the Council of Mantua to recapture Constantinople from the Ottomans, the leaders who promised 80,000 soldiers to it reneged on their commitment. The Ottoman Empire was free, for several decades, from any further serious attempts to push it out of Europe.

The victory of Hunyadi at Siege of Belgrade in 1456 halted Ottoman expansion towards Europe beyond the Balkans for 70 years. The Hungarian army was crushed by the Ottomans at the Battle of Mohács in 1526, which would lead to the end of Hungary as an independent united kingdom for almost 400 years.

== In popular culture ==
The end of the Crusade of Varna serves as the starting point for the grand strategy video game Europa Universalis IV by Paradox Development Studio, one day after the Battle of Varna, on 11 November 1444.
