= Aegan Expedition (1456) =

Aegean expedition
- Part of Ottoman wars in Europe
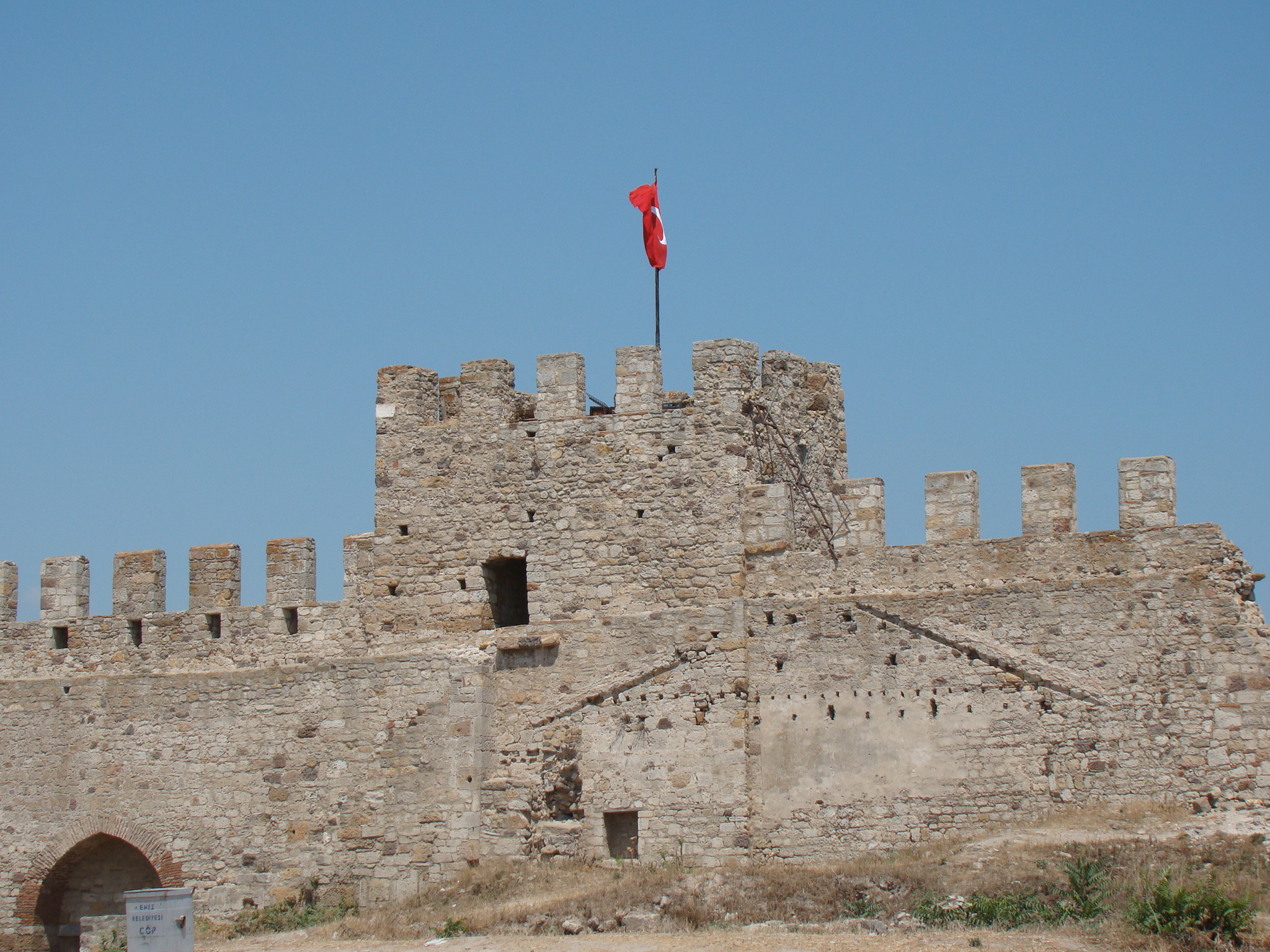
- Enez castle
Date	1456
Location	Turkey, Edirne, Enez, Lemnos, Samothrace
Result	Ottoman victory

Belligerents
Ottoman Empire	Republic of Genoa

Commanders and leaders
Mehmed II; Mirza Yunus Beg; Mahmud Pasha; Hadım İsmail Pasha; Michael Critobulus; Hamza Bey	Dorino II Gattilusio; John Ryhndacenos; Niccolò Gattilusio; Domenico Gattilusio; Giovanni Fontana; Spineta Colomboto

Strength
10 galleys	Unknown

Casualties and losses
Unknown	Unknown number of dead soldiers 150 young people were recruited into the Janissaries; 40 captives

The Aegean Expedition of 1456 was the expedition in which the Ottoman army under the command of Mehmed the Conqueror captured Enez, Lemnos and the island of Samothrace.

== Before ==
A disagreement arose between Dorino, who was the ruler of Enez, Limbos, and Samothrace, and his aunt, who had the right to govern the government. The woman filed a complaint with the Ottomans, whose sovereignty she recognized. During the Ottoman invasion of Rumelia, this place was not occupied by the Turks because the lords of Enez paid taxes to the Ottomans. And the pirates in Ainos were kidnapping the Turks and selling them as slaves in the markets. In addition, Dorino started to sell the salt that he only sold to the Ottomans to foreigners.The last time was that the Muslims of Ipsala and Firecik were attacked by the people of Enez and were beaten when they went to the town to sell their goods. Angered by these events, Sultan Mehmed declared an expedition on Enez.

== Expedition and battle ==
On January 24, 1456, the Sultan began to march towards Enez. A harsh winter prevailed in the Thracian plain. At the same time, Yunus Pasha blockaded the port of Enez with 10 galleys. But Dorino was not in town. The stern man had retired to the island of Samothrace to spend his time in his father's palace. Enez and his guards were left to their fate. A delegation of ambassadors came to the Sultan and said that they would surrender on the condition that no harm would come to the people. Sultan Mehmed welcomed the ambassadors and then sent Mahmud Pasha to take the city. The next day, the Sultan personally entered the city, entered Dorino's palace and confiscated all the valuable goods he found. He left a man named Murat as his officer in the city. Yunus Pasha also ordered to capture Imbros and Samothrace. After Yunus Pasha landed on Imbros, he summoned Kritovulos, who was loyal to him, and made him governor instead of the arrested John Lasacaris Ryhndacenos. (Lasacaris was formerly Dorino's subordinate governor).

At the same time, a ship was sent to the island of Samothrace to capture Dorino. Prince Dorino, who did not trust the Ottoman captain, preferred to go to the sultan alone; After sending his daughter ahead with gifts, he went himself. Sultan Mehmed gave Zihne in Macedonia to Dorino. But Dorino found life here intolerable and killed the Turkish guards and fled to Christendom. He settled in Naxos, married Elisabetta Crispo, daughter of Giacomo II, and stayed there until the end of his life.

The Ottoman army captured 3 islands without a fight. The people of Lemnos, affected by these events, secretly complained about Nicollo Gattilusio to the sultan; They went further and asked him to appoint a manager to the candidate. Sultan Mehmed took this as an opportunity and sent Hadım İsmail Pasha to Lemnoz to replace Hamza Pasha as the Ottoman governor. Before Ismail Pasha's arrival on the island, a war broke out with the island's inhabitants and the sailors under the command of Giovanni Fontono and Spienta Colomboto, who were sent from Lesbos by Domenico Gattilusio. Some of the sailors were killed and some were captured. Ismail, who completed his duty in May, brought 40 Lesbos prisoners as a gift to Sultan Mehmed. Mehmed, who had just returned from the Serbian Campaign, first wanted to execute them, but later spared their lives and sold them as slaves.
