= Francesco Gattilusio =

Francesco Gattilusio may refer to:

- Francesco I Gattilusio (died 1384) Lord of Lesbos
- Francesco II Gattilusio (1365–1404) Lord of Lesbos
- Francesco III Gattilusio (15th century), Lord of Thasos

== See also ==
- Gattilusi (family)
- Francesco (name)
