= Dorino Gattilusio =

Dorino Gattilusio may refer to:

- Dorino I Gattilusio (died 1455), Lord of Lesbos
- Dorino II Gattilusio (died 1488), Lord of Ainos, Samothrace and Imbros

== See also ==
- Gattilusi (family)
