= Dorino I Gattilusio =

Genoese ruler of Lesbos

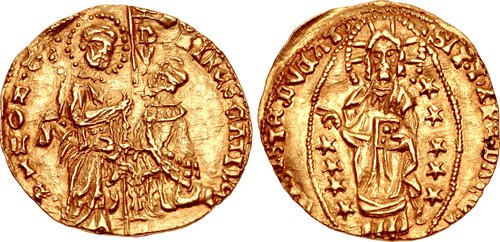
Gold coin in imitation of the Venetian ducat, struck in Dorino's name in Old Phocaea

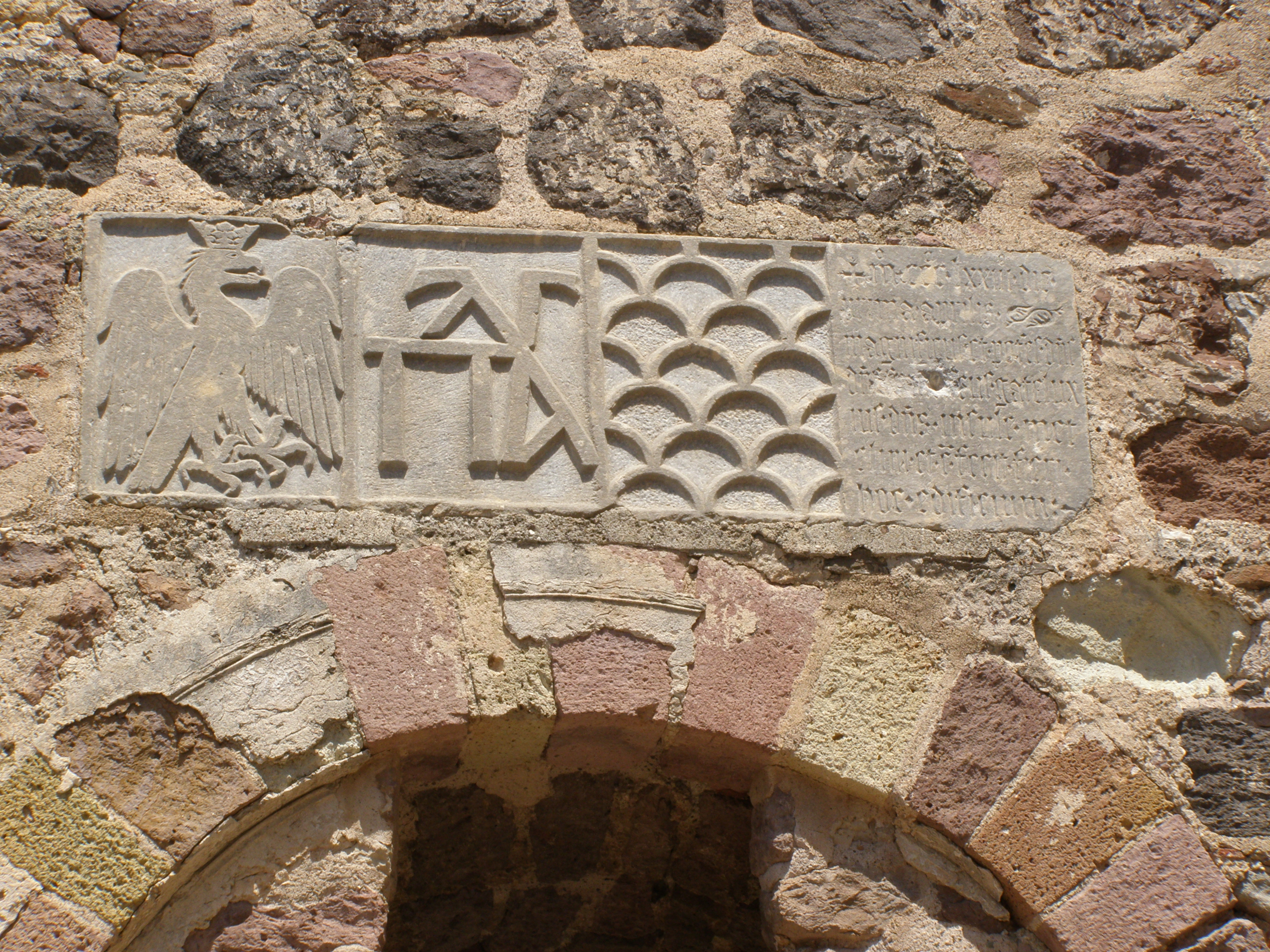
Relief at the Castle of Mytilene, showing the eagle of the Doria family (far left), the family cypher of the Palaiologoi (center left), and the Gattilusi coat of arms (center right)

Dorino Gattilusio (died 30 June 1455) was the fourth Gattilusio Lord of Lesbos from 1428 until his death. He ruled Lesbos at a time of increasing Ottoman power, and his last years were preoccupied with maintaining some measure of independence.

== Life ==
He was the second son of Francesco II Gattilusio and Valentina Doria. Dorino succeeded his older brother Jacopo Gattilusio in 1428. Prior to that he had been governor of Phocaea for several years, at least as early as 1423-4. Soon after he assumed control of Lesbos, he informed Genoa that he wished to be part of their 1428 treaty with Alfonso V of Aragon. This led to his participation in the Genoese war with Venice over the next few years.

Around 1438, apparently through the efforts of the Byzantine Empress Maria, Dorino's daughter Maria was married to Alexander of Trebizond, the exiled despotes of Trebziond, thus pulling Dorino into the politics of that Pontic state. According to Pero Tafur who met the exile at Mytilene on his homeward journey, Alexander "was preparing ships to set out for Trebizond against his brother." Tafur shared with him the news to Alexander that John had concluded an alliance with "the Turk", which had been sealed with John's marriage to "a daughter of a Turk", and that it would be detrimental to all to make war. Genoese archives contain a copy of a letter written on 10 March 1438 to Dorino Gattilusio, in which they urge him to do what he could to bring peace between Alexander and his brother, and containing an offer of a pension to Alexander if he dropped his plans which would allow him to live where ever he wanted to, Mytilene, or Constantinople. The Republic of Genoa had business interests in Trebizond that might be harmed in a civil war between the brothers.

During his tenure as lord of Lesbos, the castle of Kokkinos on Lemnos and the island of Thasos came under his control. However, Dorino was bed-ridden from 1449 onwards and his son Domenico handled the business of his realm in his name.

Following the Fall of Constantinople, Ottoman hegemony in the Aegean increased unchecked. When the Turkish admiral Hamza anchored off Lesbos in June 1455, on his way to Rhodes, his son Domenico thought it a wise diplomatic move to send his factor, the historian Doukas, to the dignitary with handsome gifts of "garments of silk, 8 woven wool garments, 6,000 minted silver coins, 20 oxen, 50 sheep, more than 800 measures of wine, 2 measures of biscuits, one measure of bread, more than 1000 litres of cheese, and fruit without measure", as well as gifts to the members of the admiral's staff. Dorino died not long after this visit.

== Family ==
Dorino married Orietta Doria. Orietta won fame in 1450 when she led the inhabitants of Mithymna on Lesbos to beat back a Turkish attack on Lesbos. The couple had six known children:

- Francesco III Gattilusio, Lord of Thasos. Married a daughter of his paternal uncle Palamede of Ainos.
- Domenico Gattilusio. Reigned from 1455 to 1458.
- Niccolò Gattilusio. Reigned from 1458 to 1462.
- Ginevra Gattilusio. Married in 1444 Giacomo II Crispo of the Duchy of the Archipelago.
- Caterina Gattilusio (d. 1442). Married Constantine XI, without (surviving?) issue.
- Maria Gattilusio. Married Alexander of Trebizond. He was a son and co-emperor of Alexios IV of Trebizond.

== Sources ==
- Miller, William (1913). "The Gattilusj of Lesbos (1355–1462)". Byzantinische Zeitschrift. 22 (2): 406-447. doi:10.1515/byzs.1913.22.2.406. S2CID 191644777.

Dorino I Gattilusio Gattilusio Born: ? Died: 1455
Preceded by Jacopo Gattilusio	Lord of Lesbos; 1428–1455	Succeeded by Domenico Gattilusio
