= Niccolò Gattilusio, Lord of Ainos =

Italian noble and first Lord of Lesbos

Niccolò Gattilusio (Ancient Greek: Νικορέζος Γατελιοῦζος, romanized: Nikorézos Gatelioûzos; died 1409) was the first member of the Gattilusio family to rule the city of Aenus (modern Enez in Turkey).

The Gattilusio family came from the Republic of Genoa. The parents of Niccolò and his brother Francesco I Gattilusio are not known, although based on the heraldic evidence of their inscriptions, Anthony Luttrell argues that their mother was a member of the Doria family. He accompanied his brother in his adventures. As the former was rewarded by the Byzantine emperor John V Palaiologos with the island of Lesbos, so Niccolò received the coastal city of Ainos, which he took title to at some point between 1376 and 1379. From 1384 to 1387 he served as regent for his nephew Francesco II Gattilusio until the two fell out in an argument between them. When his nephew died in an unusual accident, Niccolò served once more as regent, this time for Francesco's son Jacopo.

He is known to have a daughter Marietta, although the name of her mother is not recorded; she died before him. Niccolò was succeeded by his grand-nephew Palamede as ruler of Ainos.
