= Gattilusio =

Genoese noble family ruling Aegean lordships (1355–1462)

- Parent house: Doria family (maternal)
- Country: Republic of Genoa; Byzantine Empire
- Founded: 1355
- Founder: Francesco I Gattilusio
- Final ruler: Niccolò Gattilusio
- Titles: Lord of Lesbos; Lord of Aenus; Lord of Thasos; Lord of Lemnos; Lord of Samothrace; Lord of Imbros
- Estates: Lesbos, Imbros, Samothrace, Lemnos, Thasos, Aenus
- Dissolution: 15th century
- Cadet branches: Gattilusio of Aenus; Gattilusio of Thasos

The House of Gattilusio (Ancient Greek: Γατελιοῦζος, romanized: Gatelioũzos) was a Genoese noble family that ruled several lordships in the northern Aegean Sea between 1355 and 1462. Their rise began in 1354, when Francesco I Gattilusio assisted Emperor John V Palaiologos in regaining Constantinople from John VI Kantakouzenos. In 1355, Francesco married the emperor's sister Maria and received the island of Lesbos as a reward for his services against Kantakouzenos.

From their base at Mytilene, the Gattilusi extended their authority to Imbros, Samothrace, Thasos, Lemnos, and the Thracian port of Aenus (modern Enez). Controlling these islands gave them a strategic role in safeguarding the sea routes between Constantinople and the Aegean and in defending the northern approaches to the Dardanelles.

Their authority combined Genoese commercial interests with Byzantine legitimacy, reinforced through repeated marriages with the Palaiologos dynasty. Contemporary inscriptions and coinage reflected these ties, displaying both imperial and family emblems. Their rule ended with the Ottoman conquest of Lesbos in 1462.

== History ==
=== Origins ===
The Gattilusi family was founded by two brothers, Genoese adventurer Francesco Gattilusio and Niccolò Gattilusio, nephews of Oberto Gattilusio. The name of their father is not known, based on heraldic evidence Medieval historian Anthony Luttrell argues that their mother was a member of the Doria family.

According to historian Christopher Wright, the rise of the Gattilusio lordship coincided with major changes in the Aegean world. The mid-fourteenth century marked the collapse of the last Christian efforts to restore the Byzantine world and the beginning of Ottoman expansion following the fall of Gallipoli in 1354 and the death of Serbian emperor Stefan Dušan in 1355.

The weakening of Byzantine authority, together with the rivalry between the Genoese and Venetian republics for maritime dominance, allowed smaller powers to take root in the region. In this fragmented political landscape, semi-autonomous regimes such as the Gattilusio domains emerged across the northeastern Aegean, acting as intermediaries between Byzantine, Latin, and Ottoman spheres of power.

=== Establishment ===
In 1354 Francesco Gattilusio helped Emperor John V Palaiologos retake Constantinople and remove John VI Kantakouzenos from power. In gratitude, the emperor married him to his sister Maria and granted him Lesbos, then known by its capital, Mytilene, as her dowry. (Note: Lesbos was commonly referred to by the name of its capital, Mytilene, in contemporary sources.) Wright notes that contemporary accounts indicate that John V commanded a substantial force beyond Francesco's small flotilla. The emperor seems to have granted Lesbos voluntarily recognising in Gattilusio a loyal intermediary capable of safeguarding imperial interests in the Aegean. (Note: This arrangement reflected a wider late Byzantine practice of entrusting maritime territories to capable allies)

Through dynastic marriages with Orthodox families, the Gattilusi allied themselves with the imperial families of Byzantium and Trebizond and with the princely house of Serbia, connections that enhanced their prestige. During the fifteenth century, the Gattilusi acquired additional territories, the islands of Imbros, Samothrace, Lemnos, and Thasos, as well as the fortress of Kotsinos on Lemnos and the mainland city of Aenos (modern Enez). From this position, they became heavily involved in the mining and marketing of alum, a profitable Genoese-controlled trade. (Note: Alum was essential for textile dyeing and one of the most lucrative commodities traded by Genoese merchants in the late medieval eastern Mediterranean.) Relations between the Gattilusi and their Greek subjects appear to have been generally peaceful.

=== Relations with Byzantium ===
The family became closely assimilated into Byzantine society, speaking Greek, following the Orthodox Church, and maintaining Genoese ties while avoiding conflict with the Ottomans. Unlike other Latin rulers in the region, the Gattilusi did not adopt grand titles; they remained simply "lords" of their domains, relying on their imperial connections as the main source of their authority. Luttrell notes that "four successive generations of Gattilusio married into the Palaiologos family, two to emperors' daughters, one to an emperor, and one to a despot who later became an emperor", explaining their repeated involvement in Byzantine affairs. Around 1397, a granddaughter of Francesco I of Mytilene married Emperor John VII Palaiologos, and in 1441 Dorino Gattilusio's daughter wed the future Emperor Constantine XI Palaiologos.

=== Decline and fall ===
After the Fall of Constantinople in 1453, the Gattilusi briefly retained control of their possessions under Ottoman suzerainty, but were soon forced out. In 1456, the Ottomans appointed Michael Critobulus as governor of Imbros and removed the Gattilusi from their remaining lands, except Lesbos, which they held in return for an annual payment of 4,000 gold pieces.

The lord of Lesbos, Domenico Gattilusio, was strangled and briefly succeeded by his brother Niccolò, before an Ottoman fleet captured the island in September 1462, sending Niccolò as prisoner to Constantinople and putting an end to the family's power.

== Legacy ==
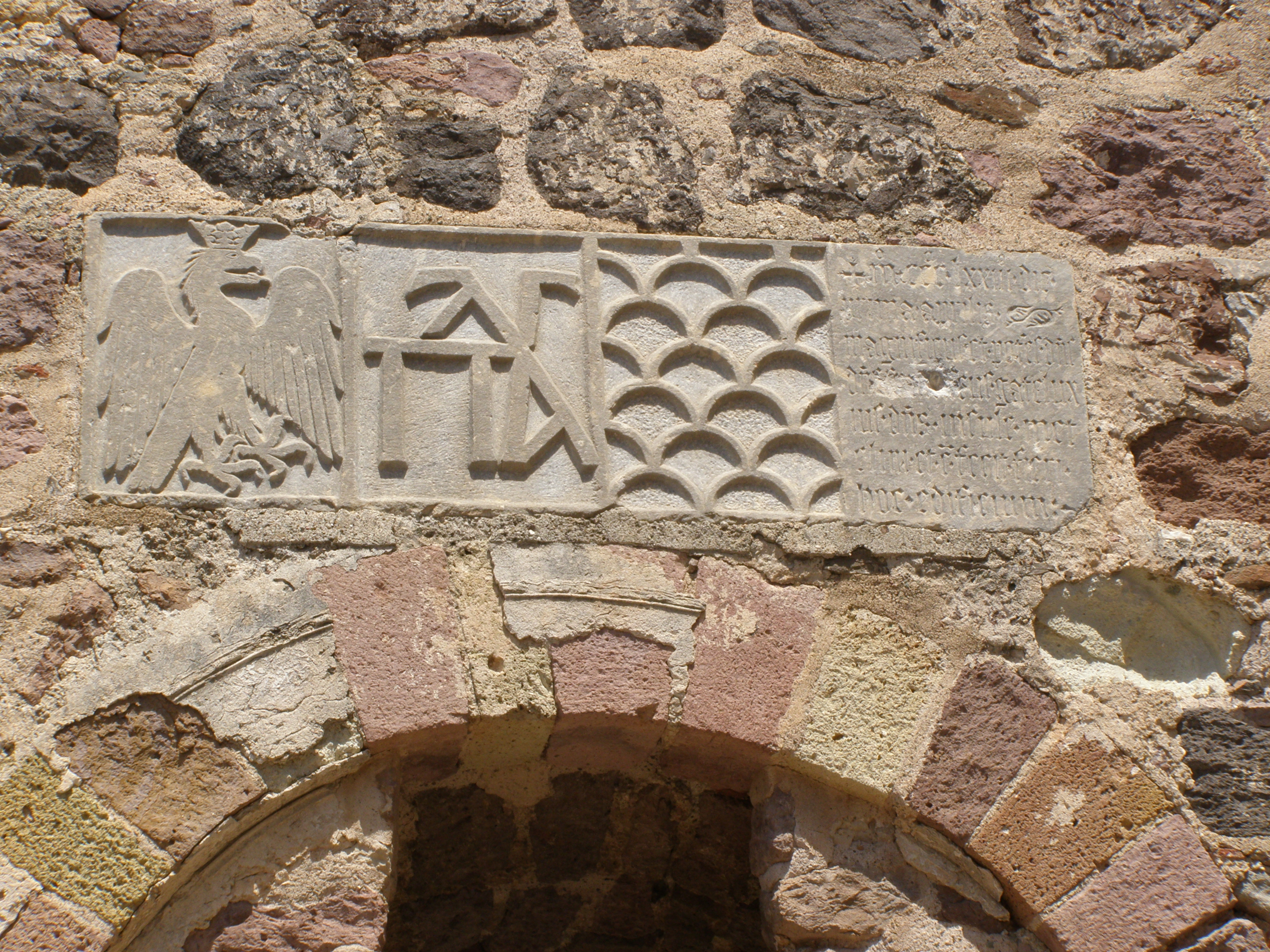
Relief at the Castle of Mytilene, showing (left to right) the eagle of the Doria family, the Palaiologoi imperial monogram, and the Gattilusio family coat-of-arms.

Letters from Demetrios Kydones mention Francesco I Gattilusio, offering glimpses of the family's ties with Byzantium. Archaeological and numismatic evidence shows how strongly the Gattilusi emphasised their loyalty to the Byzantine emperors. Their coins and heraldic plaques combine the Gattilusio arms with Palaiologos symbols such as the four Betas and the Doria eagle, reflecting their Byzantine and Genoese heritage. Fortifications on Lesbos and other islands were strengthened under their rule, and surviving mine workings may relate to the alum trade that sustained their economy.

Archaeological excavations in the Castle of Mytilene since 1983 by the University of British Columbia, directed by Caroline and Hector Williams, uncovered the possible burial chapel of the Gattilusio.

== Domains and rulers ==
The succession of Gattilusio lords known from contemporary and later records.

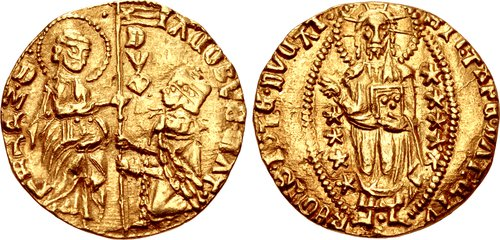
Gold ducat of Jacopo Gattilusio, Lord of Lesbos (1404–1428), minted at Mytilene; obverse showing St Mark and a kneeling Doge, reverse with Christ within a mandorla.

=== Lesbos ===
- Francesco I Gattilusio (1355–1384)
- Francesco II Gattilusio (1384–1404)
- Jacopo Gattilusio (1404–1428)
- Dorino I Gattilusio (1428–1455)
- Domenico Gattilusio (1455–1458)
- Niccolò Gattilusio (1458–1462)

=== Aenus ===
- Niccolò Gattilusio (1376–1409)
- Palamede Gattilusio (1409–1455)
- Dorino II Gattilusio (1455–1456)

=== Thasos ===
- Dorino I Gattilusio (c.1434)
- Francesco III Gattilusio (1444–c.1449)
- Dorino I Gattilusio (again) (c. 1449)
- Domenico Gattilusio (1449–1455, regent) (30 June 1455–October 1455)

=== Lemnos ===
- Dorino I Gattilusio (1453)
- Domenico Gattilusio (1453–1455, regent) (1455–1456)

=== Samothrace ===
- Palamede Gattilusio (c.1431)
- (Governed by Byzantine governor Joannes Laskaris Rhyndakenos 1444-1455)
- Dorino II Gattilusio (1455–1456)

=== Imbros ===
- Palamede Gattilusio (1453)
- (Governed by Byzantine governor Joannes Laskaris Rhyndakenos)
- Dorino II Gattilusio (1455–1456)

== Family Tree ==
Andronikos III Palaiologos ∞ Anna of Savoy	Domenico Gattilusio ∞ Soffredina
John V Palaiologos ∞ Helena Kantakouzene	Andronikos IV Palaiologos ∞ Keratsa of Bulgaria	Maria Palaiologina	Francesco I Gattilusio; Lord of Mytilene (1355–1384)	Niccolò Gattilusio; Lord of Ainos (1382–1409/11)
Francesco II Gattilusio; Lord of Mytilene (1384–1403/04)
Manuel II Palaiologos ∞ Helena Dragaš	John VII Palaiologos	Irene Gattilusio	Jacopo Palaiologos Gattilusio; Lord of Mytilene (1403–1426/8)	Dorino Palaiologos Gattilusio; Lord of Mytilene (1426/8–1455); Lord of Old Phokaia (c.1416–1426/8) ∞ Orietta Doria	Palamede Palaiologos Gattilusio; Lord of Ainos (1414/21–1455)
Andronikos V Palaiologos
Constantine Dragases Palaiologos	Caterina Gattilusio	Domenico Gattilusio; Lord of Mytilene (1455–1458)	Niccolò Gattilusio; Lord of Mytilene (1458–1462); Lord of Lemnos (c.1453–1456	Maria Gattilusio ∞ Alexander Megas Komnenos	Francesco III Gattilusio; Lord of Thasos (1440s)	Unknown Daughter	Dorino II Gattilusio; Lord of Ainos (1455–1456)

== Sources ==
- Harris, Jonathan; Holmes, Catherine; Russell, Eugenia (29 November 2012). Byzantines, Latins, and Turks in the Eastern Mediterranean World After 1150. OUP Oxford. ISBN 978-0-19-964188-8.
- Luttrell, Anthony (1986). "John V's Daughters: A Palaiologan Puzzle". Dumbarton Oaks Papers. 40: 110–112. doi:10.2307/1291531. JSTOR 1291531.
- McKitterick, Rosamond (1995). The New Cambridge Medieval History: Volume 7, c.1415–c.1500. Cambridge University Press. ISBN 978-0-521-38296-0.
- Setton, Kenneth Meyer (1976). The Papacy and the Levant, 1204–1571: The Thirteenth and Fourteenth Centuries. Vol. I. American Philosophical Society. ISBN 978-0-87169-114-9.
- Setton, Kenneth Meyer (1984). The Papacy and the Levant, 1204–1571: The Fifteenth Century. Vol. II. American Philosophical Society. ISBN 978-0-87169-162-0.
- Williams, Hector (2015). "Archaic Architectural Fragments from Ancient Mytilene". Publications de l'Institut Français d'Études Anatoliennes. 3 (1): 83–87.
- "Hector Williams". Department of Ancient Mediterranean and Near Eastern Studies. 2 November 2022.
- Wright, Christopher (2014). The Gattilusio Lordships and the Aegean World, 1355–1462. The Medieval Mediterranean. Vol. 100. Brill. doi:10.1163/9789004264816. ISBN 978-90-04-26481-6.
- Miller, William (1922). Essays on the Latin Orient. Cambridge University Press. ISBN 9781107455535.
