= Mardaliç Island =

Island in Turkey

Native name: Mardaliç Adası
- Location within Turkey

Geography
- Location: Aegean Sea
- Coordinates: 38°55′N 26°49′E
- Area: 2.1 km^{2} (0.81 sq mi)

Administration
- Turkey
- İl (province): İzmir Province
- İlçe: Dikili

Mardaliç Island (also called "Corci Island" Turkish: Mardaliç Adası) is an Aegean island of Turkey.

== Location ==
The island at 38°55′N 26°49′E is a part of Dikili ilçe (district) of İzmir Province. The island faces Narlıdere Bay in mainland Anatolia. Its distance to the nearest point of the mainland is about 1.5 kilometres (0.93 mi). The island measures 2.1 square kilometres.

== History ==
In antiquity, the island was known as Elaiousa Erythraion. In the 14th century the island was a part of the Republic of Genoa. Francesco I Gattilusio and his successors controlled Lesbos and the smaller islands around like Mardaliç for about a century. In 1462 Mahmut Pasha of the Ottoman Empire captured the island. But soon the island became a pirates' island. Especially Georgia Maria from the island Corsica who allied himself with the Republic of Venice became a big problem for the people living in the coastal area of west Anatolia. In the 17th century the Ottoman navy recaptured the island. Corci, the alternative name of the island is a corrupt form of the name Georgia.

== The island today ==
The island is uninhabited. But there are some ruins from the Genoa era. The most important ruin is an observation tower. Birds such as sea gull and partridge as well as some snakes and lizards make up the fauna of the island. Olive, thyme and scale fern are some of the plants.
