= Domenico Gattilusio =

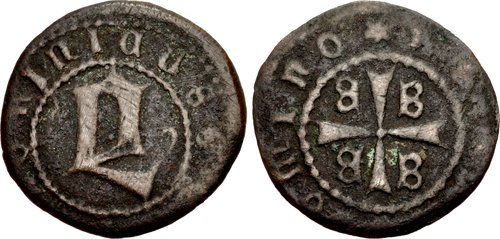
Bronze denaro of Domenico Gattilusio, with a large "D" on the obverse, and the tetragrammatic cross of the Byzantine Empire on the reverse

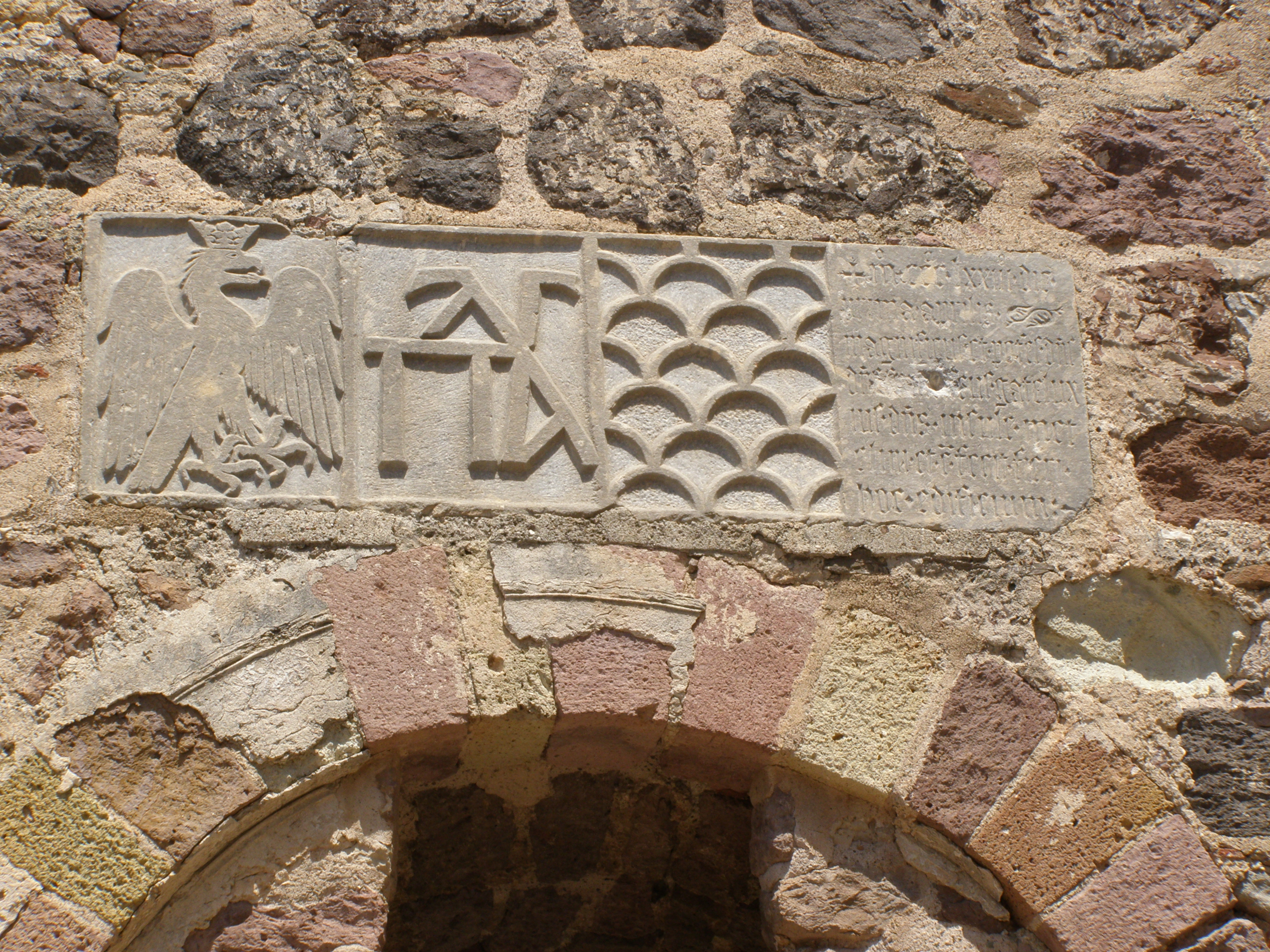
Relief at the Castle of Mytilene, showing the eagle of the Doria family (far left), the family cypher of the Palaiologoi (center left), and the Gattilusi coat of arms (center right)

Domenico Gattilusio (died 1458) was the fifth Gattilusio lord of Lesbos from 1455 to 1458. He was a son of Dorino I Gattilusio and Orietta Doria.

== Life ==
Domenico served as regent for his father after the latter became bedridden in 1449. He succeeded his father on the latter's death, at a time of growing Ottoman hegemony; when the Turkish admiral, on his way to Rhodes, anchored off Lesbos in June 1455, Domenico sent his official, the historian Doukas, to the dignitary with handsome gifts of "garments of silk, 8 woven wool garments, 6,000 minted silver coins, 20 oxen, 50 sheep, more than 800 measures of wine, 2 measures of biscuits, one measure of bread, more than 1000 litres of cheese, and fruit without measure", as well as gifts to the members of the admiral's staff. Not long after this visit Domenico's father died; Domenico made himself lord over his father's territories—at this point comprising the islands of Lesbos, Thasos, Lemnos and the mainland town of Phocaea—while appointing his younger brother Niccolò his governor of Lemnos.

When Doukas took the annual tribute to Sultan Mehmed II in Adrianople that August, the Sultan learned that Dorino had died and Domenico was now lord of Lesbos; this angered the Sultan, and Doukas was informed that no one had the right to assume the title of lord of Lesbos until he had received it from the hands of the Sultan himself. Nervous negotiations followed, and Domenico only obtained title to his inheritance after surrendering the isle of Thasos and paying an increased tribute of 4000 gold pieces, instead of the 3000 previously given. But that was not the only loss to Domenico's realm, for on the excuse of lèse-majesté the Turkish admiral Yunus Pasha sailed to Phocaea and seized it outright for the Sultan on 31 October 1455.

After the Sultan's men captured the mainland town of Ainos (modern Enez in Turkey) on 24 January 1456 and annexed the islands of Samothrace and Imbros from Domenico's cousin Dorino later that year, a Papal fleet under the command of the Cardinal Ludovico Trevisan, Patriarch of Aquileia, arrived in the northern Aegean Sea in the autumn of 1456. This fleet swiftly took the islands of Samothrace, Thasos, and Imbros from the Ottomans, but instead of returning them to the Gattilusio family, appointed governors to rule them in the name of the Pope. Sultan Mehmed vented his resentment upon Domenico, whom he held responsible for these losses, by sending his admiral Ishmael in August 1457 to attack Lesbos. Despite the flight of the Papal fleet from Lesbos, the garrison of Molivos resisted so successfully that the Turkish commander was forced to withdraw on 9 August. Upon the departure of the Turkish forces, the Papal fleet returned to be greeted with indignation by Domenico Gattilusio.

Domenico reigned over the island for three years. He was deposed by his younger brother Niccolò, who had him imprisoned and ordered his execution by the garrote. Domenico married Maria Giustiniani-Longo. They had no known children.

== Sources ==
- Miller, William (1913). "The Gattilusj of Lesbos (1355–1462)". Byzantinische Zeitschrift. 22 (2). doi:10.1515/byzs.1913.22.2.406. S2CID 191644777.

Domenico Gattilusio Gattilusio Born: ? Died: 1458
Preceded by Dorino I Gattilusio	Lord of Lesbos; 1455–1458	Succeeded by Niccolò Gattilusio
