= Francesco II Gattilusio =

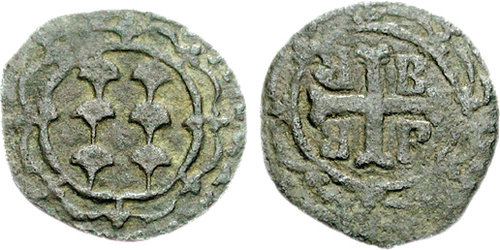
Bronze denaro of Francesco II, with the Gattilusi arms and the tetragrammic cross of the Byzantine Empire

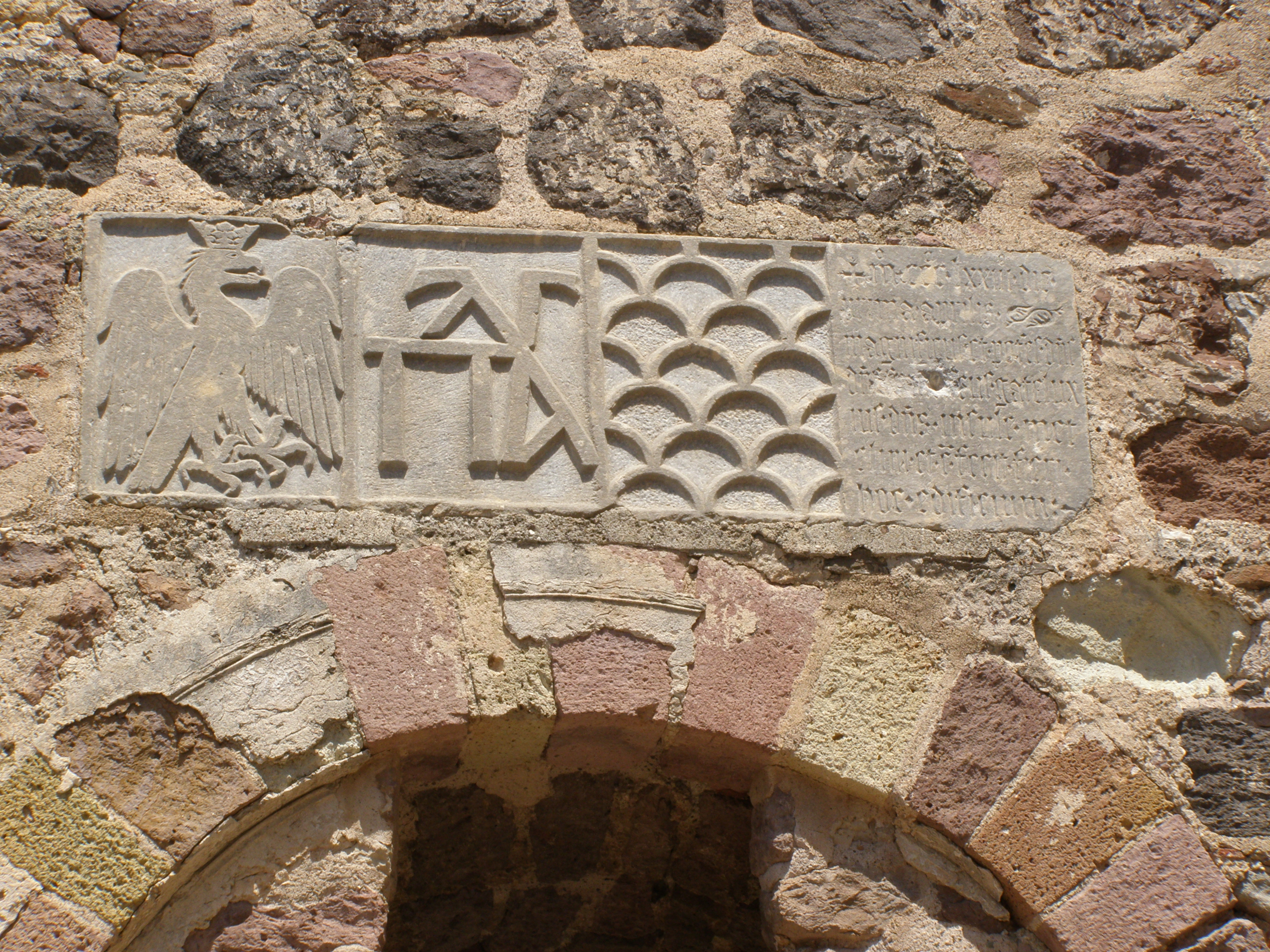
Relief at the Castle of Mytilene, showing the eagle of the Doria family (far left), the family cypher of the Palaiologoi (center left), and the Gattilusi coat of arms (center right)

Francesco II Gattilusio (born Giacomo Gattilusio or Jacopo Gattilusio; Ancient Greek: Φραντζέσκος Γατελιοῦζος, romanized: Phrantzéskos Gatelioûzos c. 1365 – 26 October 1403/1404) was the second Gattilusio lord of Lesbos, from 1384 to his death. He was the third son of Francesco I Gattilusio and Maria Palaiologina, the sister of the Byzantine emperor John V Palaiologos.

== Life ==
On 6 August 1384, an earthquake struck Lesbos. Amongst the dead were Francesco I Gattilusio and his two eldest sons, Andronico and Domenico. However the third son Jacopo survived: at the time the earthquake struck, he was sleeping by the side of his brothers in a tower of their castle, but the next day he was discovered in a vineyard at the base of the castle. He succeeded in the rule of Lesbos under the name Francesco II. Francesco II was still underage and was placed under the regency of his paternal uncle Niccolò of Ainos.

The regency lasted three years when an argument between the two ended it and Niccolò returned to his own demesne. On the recommendation of their mutual friend, Demetrius Cydones, Francesco allowed Manuel Palaiologos to shelter on Lesbos for at least two months in the summer of 1387, after Manuel had fled Thessalonica. However Francesco did not allow Manuel to take up residence inside the walls of Mytilene, possibly due to the size of his entourage or because Francesco did not want to anger the Ottoman Sultan Murad I.

In November 1388, Francesco joined in an alliance with the Knights of Rhodes, the Genoese of Chios, Jacques I of Cyprus, and the Genoese of Galata against Sultan Murad. In the summer of 1396 when Pera was besieged by the soldiers of Bajazet I, his galley happened to be stationed in the Golden Horn; the Genoese community of Pera petitioned Francesco for his help; he subsequently assisted the Venetians making a sortie to relieve Constantinople. Francisco, along with his uncle Niccolò, also pledged considerable sums in ransoming prisoners taken at the Battle of Nicopolis (1396); of the total ransom, fixed at 200,000 ducats, the two men made themselves liable for 150,000—which the prisoners promised to repay as soon as they could.

This act, as well as the location of Lesbos, resulted in his home being frequently visited by traveling important personages from Western Europe: "this was their last stopping-place in Latin lands on their way to Constantinople or to Asia," William Miller writes. Ruy Gonzáles de Clavijo, the ambassador Henry III of Castile sent to Tamerlane in 1403, stayed with Francesco at one point in his outward journey, and records he met John VII Palaiologos, "the young Emperor" in his household; de Clavijo notes that John "resided a good deal in this island".

The name of Francesco's wife is not known. A clue to her identity is the statement of Konstantin the Philosopher, biographer of Stefan Lazarević, who wrote around 1431 that Stefan's wife (a daughter of Francesco II) was "through her mother a niece of the emperor Manuel, from whom the lords and lineage of her family were named Palaiologi." Which niece of the Emperor Manuel this was, or if her existence is otherwise recorded, remains a mystery.

Francesco reportedly died in an unusual manner. After having been bitten by a scorpion, the number of people rushing to his aid resulted in the wooden floor of his room collapsing under their combined weight. The poison did not kill him but the fall did.

== Family ==
Francesco had six known children:

- Jacopo Gattilusio. Ruled Lesbos from 1403/04 to 1428.
- Dorino I Gattilusio. Ruled Lesbos from 1428 to 1455.
- Palamede Gattilusio. Ruled Ainos from 1409 to 1455.
- Irene Gattilusio. Married John VII Palaiologos, mother of Andronikos V Palaiologos.
- Helena Gattilusio. Married in 1405 Stefan Lazarević, without any known issue.
- Caterina Gattilusio. Married Pietro Grimaldi, Baron of Bueil.

According to George T. Dennis, Francesco also had an illegitimate son named Giorgio, who was the recipient of at least one letter from the Byzantine Emperor Manuel II Palaiologos, who served as his emissary for Francesco to the Duke of Burgundy in September/October 1397.

== Sources ==
- Miller, William (1921). Essays on the Latin Orient. Cambridge at the University Press.
- Wright, Christopher (2014). The Gattilusio Lordships and the Aegean World 1355-1462. Brill.

Francesco II Gattilusio Gattilusio Born: c. 1365 Died: 1404
| Preceded by Francesco I Gattilusio | Lord of Lesbos; 1384–1404 | Succeeded by Jacopo Gattilusio |
