= Jacopo Gattilusio =

Third Lord of Lesbos

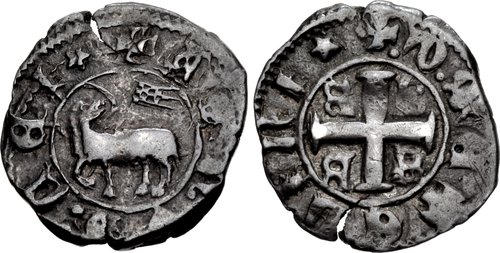
Silver grosseto of Jacopo, with the Lamb of God and the tetragrammatic cross of the Byzantine Emperors

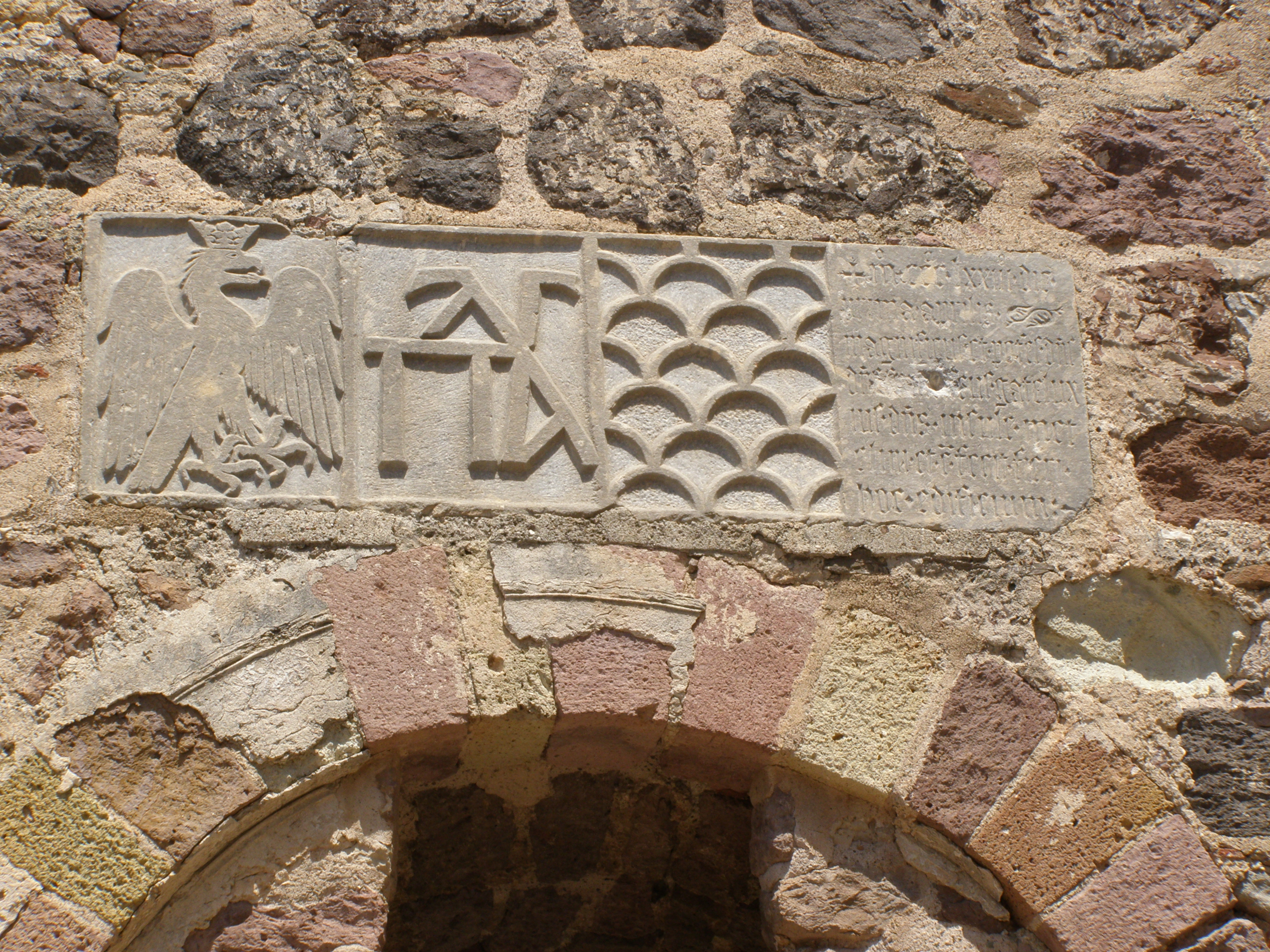
Relief at the Castle of Mytilene, showing the eagle of the Doria family (far left), the family cypher of the Palaiologoi (center left), and the Gattilusi coat of arms (center right)

Jacopo Gattilusio (or Giacomo; died 1428) was the third Lord of Lesbos. He was the eldest son of Francesco II of Lesbos, whom he succeeded as lord of the island on 26 October 1404.

William Miller summarized Jacopo's motivation as a semi-autonomous ruler was to favor Genoese interests when they conflicted with Venetian ones, but to cooperate with both when they showed signs of uniting against his neighbors, the Ottomans. For example, he aided Centurione II Zaccaria, Prince of Achaea against the Tocchi of Cephalonia and Zante.

He had no sons, so on his death he was succeeded by his younger brother Dorino I Gattilusio.

== Marriage ==
Jacopo was married to Bona Grimaldi. Only one child is known:

- A daughter. Married to Nicholas Crispo, Lord of Syros. He was a son of Francesco I Crispo of the Duchy of the Archipelago.

Niccolò mentioned Jacopo as his father-in-law in his correspondence from the year 1426. However the name of his wife remains unknown. Niccolò had eleven children but no record exists of their mother or mothers.

An account by Caterino Zeno dated to 1474 names Niccolò as married to an otherwise unknown Eudoksia Valenza, sister of Theodora Megale Komnene, daughter of John IV of Trebizond, but this is debunked, as John had an only daughter.

Jacopo Gattilusio Gattilusio Born: ? Died: 1428
| Preceded by Francesco II Gattilusio | Lord of Lesbos; 1404–1428 | Succeeded by Dorino I Gattilusio |
