= Niccolò Gattilusio =

Final Lord of Lesbos

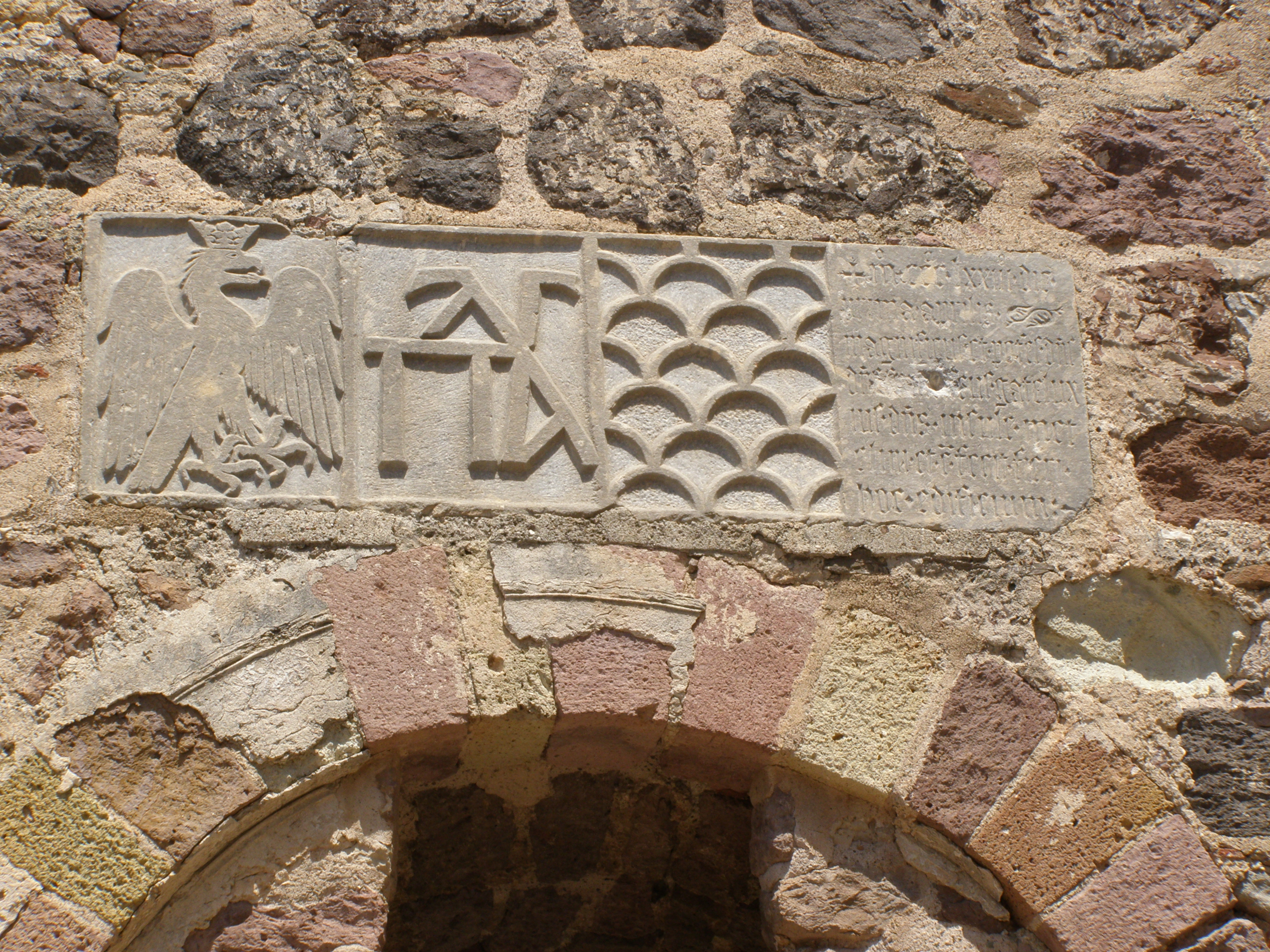
Relief at the Castle of Mytilene, showing the eagle of the Doria family (far left), the family cypher of the Palaiologoi (center left), and the Gattilusio coat of arms (center right)

Niccolò Gattilusio (died 1462) was the sixth and last Gattilusio lord of Lesbos, from 1458 to 1462. He was a younger son of Dorino I Gattilusio and Orietta Doria.

He deposed his elder brother Domenico Gattilusio, threw him in prison, and had him strangled. The Ottoman Sultan Mehmed II used this crime as his pretext to invade Lesbos. According to Franz Babinger, Mehmed's true motivation was that Niccolò had sheltered Catalan pirates in return for a considerable share of their loot; these pirates were preying on the nearby Anatolian coast, kidnapping their inhabitants and selling them as slaves.

In 1462, Mehmed marched from Constantinople at the head of a detachment of Janissaries across Anatolia to Assos (near the modern Behram Köy), where on 1 September he was met by a fleet containing the balance of his forces, after which he crossed over to Lesbos. First his troops laid waste to the countryside, hoping this would intimidate Niccolò into surrendering; but Niccolò, trusting in the fortifications of his city of Mytilini and its garrison of 5,000, announced he would go down fighting. Sultan Mehmed proceeded to conquer Mytilini: after four days of skirmishing, Mehmed ordered the city bombarded with the six giant cannons he brought with him. The damage these cannons caused could not be repaired, and when the Janissaries penetrated the city, Niccolò was forced to admit his defeat. He surrendered Mytilini and the rest of the island.

Niccolò was carried off to Constantinople as a captive, along with most of his family. There he converted to Islam and was briefly released. His sister Maria Gattilusio (widow of Alexander, the brother of Emperor David of Trebizond), who was said to be lovely, entered the imperial harem. Her son Alexios became a page and as some sources relate, a favorite of the sultan, but seems to have been beheaded not long afterwards.

Then Mehmed II discovered that a favorite page of his, who had fled from him some time before, had become Christian and was included among the retinue of Niccolò. This final indignity seems to have hastened Niccolò's death sentence. He was strangled to death with a bowstring in Constantinople.

Niccolò Gattilusio Gattilusio Born: ? Died: 1462
Preceded by Domenico Gattilusio	Lord of Lesbos; 1458–1462	Ottoman conquest of Lesbos
