= Caterina Gattilusio =

Byzantine empress

Caterina Gattilusio (died August 1442) was the second wife of Constantine XI, the last Byzantine emperor, while he was still Despot of the Morea.

She was a daughter of Dorino of Lesbos and Orietta Doria. In 1440, Caterina was betrothed to Constantine Palaiologos. The Chronicle of George Sphrantzes records the author himself arriving in Lesbos Island on 6 December 1440 to negotiate for the hand of Caterina.

The following year Constantine sailed for Lesbos with Sphrantzes and Loukas Notaras, and in August the marriage took place at Mytilene in August, then the next year Constantine sailed to the Morea to resume his duties. However, the marriage lasted about a year: Constantine, returning to Constantinople in July 1442, stopped at Mytilene to collect his wife, and proceeded to Lemnos where he was caught by, as Sphrantes describes, "the whole Turkish fleet". Although the Turkish fleet left after a few days, Caterina fell ill and suffered a miscarriage that August. She died not long afterwards at Palaiokastron on Lemnos. Constantine never remarried.
