= Doukas (historian) =

Byzantine historian

- Born: c. 1400 somewhere in western Asia Minor (modern-day Turkey)
- Died: after 1462
- Occupation: historian
- Known for: being one of the most important sources for the last decades and eventual fall of the Byzantine Empire to the Ottomans

Doukas or Dukas (Greek: Δούκας; c. 1400 – after 1462) was a Byzantine Greek historian who flourished under Constantine XI Palaiologos, the last Byzantine Emperor. He is one of the most important sources for the last decades and eventual fall of the Byzantine Empire to the Ottomans.

== Life ==
The date of Doukas's birth is not recorded, nor is his first name or the names of his parents. He was probably born somewhere in western Asia Minor in the 1390s, where his paternal grandfather, Michael Doukas, had fled. Michael Doukas was eulogized by his grandson as a learned man, especially in matters of medicine. He had played a role in the Byzantine civil wars of the mid-14th century as a partisan of John VI Kantakouzenos. Michael Doukas had been arrested by Alexios Apokaukos, and was one of the prisoners at the palace where Apokaukos was murdered by some of the inmates. Michael narrowly avoided becoming one of the 200 prisoners murdered in retribution by hiding in the underground chamber of the New Church. He and five others disguised themselves as monks and managed to escape Constantinople. Michael met Isa, the grandson of Aydin, who became his patron and established him at Ephesus. He remained there even after the end of the civil war since he was convinced that sooner or later all of the remnants of the Byzantine state would succumb to the Turkish onslaught. Although his grandson claims so, it is unknown how, if at all, Michael was related to the old Byzantine imperial dynasty of the Doukai.

All that is known of the younger Doukas is what he reveals about himself in his history. His earliest autobiographical allusion is dated to 1421, when he lived in New Phocaea and served as the secretary of the local Genoese governor, Giovanni Adorno. From New Phocaea, Doukas found employment with the ruling Gattilusi family on Lesbos, which employed him in various diplomatic missions to the Ottoman court. In 1451, he was in Adrianople when Murad II died and Mehmed II first entered the capital being proclaimed sultan for the second time. In 1452, when Mehmed's army was beginning the siege of Constantinople, he was in Didymoteicho, where he saw the corpses of the Venetian crew and their captain executed for failing to stop at the fortress of Rumeli Hisar. In 1455, Doukas twice acted on behalf of the Gattilusi to the Ottomans, first delivering gifts to Hamza Bey the Ottoman admiral, then in August delivered the annual tribute to the Sultan, a visit that required Doukas to bring his new master, Domenico Gattilusio, before the Sultan.

He was still living on Lesbos in 1462, when it was conquered by the Ottoman Empire by Sultan Mehmed II. It is known that Doukas survived this event, but there is no record of his subsequent life, and he may have died at about this time.

== Work ==
Doukas was the author of a history of the period 1341–1462; his work thus continues that of Nikephoros Gregoras and John Kantakouzenos and supplements George Sphrantzes and Laonikos Chalkokondyles. There is a preliminary chapter of chronology from Adam to John V Palaiologos. After the preliminary chapter, he begins his work on history with description of the Battle of Kosovo. Doukas considered the Ottoman conquests as a divine punishment, criticised Mehmed II's immorality and cruelty and ardently supported the union of the Greek and Latin churches as a prerequisite for saving what was left of the Byzantine Empire. His work is thus "generally considered biased but reliable" and a particularly valuable source since he was an eyewitness to many of the events included in his history, knew Italian and Turkish and was thus drew upon Genoese and Ottoman sources. Doukas is also the only Byzantine source to mention the revolt of Börklüce Mustafa.

The editio princeps by I. Bullialdus (Paris, 1649), with a Latin translation on facing pages and copious notes, was based on one manuscript, currently in Paris, Bibliothèque Nationale MS. Gr. 1310 (Grecu's P, dated 16th century). A folio edition was published in Venice by the Javarina Press in 1729. I. Bekker (1834) produced an edition for the Bonn series, which includes a 15th-century Italian translation by an unknown author, found by Leopold Ranke in one of the libraries of Venice, and sent by him to August Bekker; the translation continues where the Greek text ends in mid-sentence and completes the account of the Ottoman conquest of Lesbos. This addition has led some scholars to conclude the Italian translation was made from a more complete copy of Doukas' history, but Harry J. Magoulias has argued that it is more likely "that the translator may have simply borrowed from another source in order to supplement the account of the siege of Mitylene in 1462". A fourth edition of this was prepared by Jacques Paul Migne for the Patrologia Graeca series, vol. 157.

For many years, it was thought that Doukas' history existed in a single manuscript in the Bibliothèque Nationale, but in the same library, Vasile Grecu discovered a second manuscript containing Doukas' work, Bibliothèque Nationale MS. Gr. 1766 (Grecu's P1, dated 18th century), which allowed him to publish a new critical edition (Bucharest, 1958), with improvements on prior editions to which Grecu added a Romanian translation. Magoulias published the first English translation in 1975 based on Grecu's critical edition.

== Sources ==
- Kazhdan, Alexander, ed. (1991). The Oxford Dictionary of Byzantium. Oxford and New York: Oxford University Press. ISBN 0-19-504652-8.
- Magoulias, Harry, ed. (1975). Decline and Fall of Byzantium to the Ottoman Turks, by Doukas. An Annotated Translation of "Historia Turco-Byzantina". Detroit: Wayne State University Press. ISBN 978-0-8143-1540-8.
- Miller, William (1926). "The Historians Doukas and Phrantzes". The Journal of Hellenic Studies. 46: 63–71. doi:10.2307/625571. ISSN 0075-4269.
- Nicol, Donald M. (1993). The Last Centuries of Byzantium, 1261–1453 (2nd ed.). Cambridge: University Press.
- Polemis, Demetrios I. (1968). The Doukai: A Contribution to Byzantine Prosopography. London: The Athlone Press.
