= Dorino II Gattilusio =

Dorino II Gattilusio (died c. 1488) was the Lord of Ainos, Samothrace and Imbros from 1455 to January 1456. He was the second son of Palamede Gattilusio.

== History ==
Upon his father's death, Dorino seized all of his father's properties as his own, despite the rights of his older brother's widow and children by primogeniture. The widow attempted a peaceful resolution, but when Dorino refused to negotiate she sent her uncle to petition the Ottoman Sultan Mehmed II for help. This, along with complaints from the Turkish judges of Ipsala and Ferecik induced the Sultan to take action: 24 January 1456 he led an army by land on the city while his admiral Yunus Pasha established a blockade with a squadron of 10 ships. At the time Dorino was absent from Ainos, wintering on Samothrace. Without their master, the inhabitants of Ainos negotiated their surrender to the Sultan.

After accepting the surrender of Ainos, Mehmed II then sent Yunus Pasha to seize Samothrace and Imbros; the admiral appointed the historian Kritobulos governor of Imros. At the same time Yunus Pasha sent a ship to take Dorino into custody; suspicious of the admiral, Dorino preferred to travel to the Sultan by his own means, first sending his daughter with lavish gifts ahead. Sultan Mehmed inclined to returning the two island to Dorino until he learned from Yunus Pasha the discontent of Dorino's subjects. Instead Mehmed II granted Dorino an estate far from the sea, at Ziche in Macedonia. Dorino was unhappy with his new residence, and after picking a quarrel with his Ottoman "guard of honor" he massacred them and fled Ziche. First he settled in Lesbos, then moved to Naxos which he made his permanent home.

== Personal life ==
Dorino married in 1454 his cousin Elisabetta Crispo (born 1445), daughter of Giacomo II Crispo, thirteenth Duke of the Archipelago, and wife Ginevra Gattilusio. They had no children.
