= Francesco III Gattilusio =

Francesco III Gattilusio was a Lord of Thasos. He was a son of Dorino I of Lesbos and wife Orietta Doria.

He married his cousin Gattilusio, daughter of his uncle Palamede of Ainos and wife Valentina N, without issue.

The traveller and antiquarian Cyriac of Ancona addressed a poem in honour of Francesco while he was visiting Thasos in January 1445.
