= Palamede Gattilusio =

Palamede Gattilusio (c. 1389–1455) was the Lord of Ainos from 1409 to his death, succeeding his great-uncle Niccolò. He was a younger son of Francesco II of Lesbos.

During the early years of his reign over Ainos, the city prospered, as attested by six inscriptions which survived into the 20th century. The churches of the Chrysopege and of St. Nicholas were erected at that time. It was also during his tenure that Samothrace came into the possession of the Gattilusio family, for when Bertrandon de la Broquiere visited Ainos in 1433, he wrote that Samothrace was part of Palamede's lands.

== Family ==
He married a woman named Valentina and had six children:

- Giorgio Gattilusio (died 1449), married Helena Notara, daughter of Loukas Notaras.
- Dorino II Gattilusio, married Elisabetta Crispo, daughter of Giacomo II Crispo
- Caterina Gattilusio, married Marino Doria
- Ginevra Gattilusio (died shortly aft. 3 May 1489), married Lodovico di Campofregoso, Doge of Genoa (died 1498)
- Constanza Gattilusio, married Gian Galeazzo di Campofregoso, brother of Lodovico
- A daughter who was married to her cousin Francesco III of Thasos, without issue
