= Michael Critobulus =

Byzantine historian (c. 1410 – c. 1470)

Michael Critobulus (Greek: Μιχαήλ Κριτόβουλος; c. 1410 – c. 1470) was a Greek politician, scholar and historian. He is known as the author of a history of the Ottoman conquest of the Eastern Roman Empire under Sultan Mehmet II. Critobulus' work, along with the writings of Doukas, Laonicus Chalcondyles and George Sphrantzes, is one of the principal sources for the Fall of Constantinople in 1453.

Critobulus is a Romanization of the name, which is alternatively transliterated as Kritoboulos, Kritovoulos, Critoboulos; sometimes with Critobulus' provenance affixed (e.g. Critobulus of Imbros).

== Biography ==
Critobulus' birth name was Michael Critopoulos (Greek: Μιχαήλ Κριτόπουλος). He changed this modern Greek family name to the more classical-sounding "Kritoboulos" in reference to a figure of that name in the dialogues of Plato.

He belonged to a family of landowners on the island of Imbros. In the 1450s he was a local political leader of the island and played an active role in the peaceful handover of Imbros, Limnos, and Thasos to the Ottomans after the final breakdown of the Byzantine Empire.

== Works ==
He later wrote the work History in five books. It is a historical account of the rise of the Ottomans and the final conquest of the remainder of the Roman Empire. Its main part is a biography of the Ottoman sultan Mehmet II, the Conqueror, to whom the work was also dedicated. Writing under Ottoman rule, Critobulus expressed admiration for Mehmet in his work, and combined mourning for the Greek loss with an acceptance of the shift of power to the Ottoman Turks, which he interpreted as a divinely ordained world historic event.

In doing so, Critobulus took as a literary model the works of Flavius Josephus, the Jewish-Roman historian of the Roman destruction of Jerusalem. His text is the most detailed historical account of the first decade of Turkish rule in Constantinople, including the Ottoman efforts of rebuilding and repopulating the city. The autograph of his text has been preserved in the Library of the Topkapı Palace in Istanbul.

He used Thucydides as a model for his History.

== Editions ==
- Karl Wilhelm Ludwig Müller, Fragmenta Historicorum Graecorum, vol. 5, 1873.
- Diether R. Reinsch (ed.), Critobuli Imbriotae historiae. (Corpus Fontium Historiae Byzantinae 22). Berlin: de Gruyter, 1983.
- Diether R. Reinsch and Photini Kolovou (ed. and transl.), Κριτοβούλου του Ιμβρίου Ιστορία. Athens: Kanaki, 2005.
- Charles T. Rigg (ed. and transl.), History of Mehmed the Conqueror. Princeton: Princeton UP, 1954.
