= Francesco I Gattilusio =

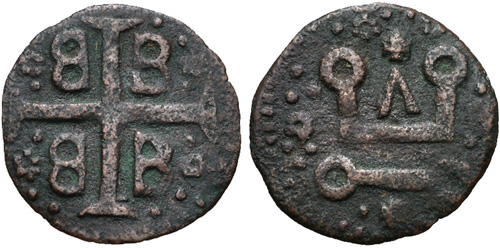
Billon Denaro of Francesco I, showing the Byzantine Emperor's tetragrammatic cross as a sign of his vassal status.

Francesco I Gattilusio (Ancient Greek: Φραντζέσκος Γατελιοῦζος, romanized: Phrantzéskos Gatelioûzos; c. 1325 – 6 August 1384) was an Italian noble, the first member of the Gattilusio family to rule the Aegean island of Lesbos as a vassal of the Byzantine emperor.

== Freebooter ==
The Gattilusio family came from the Republic of Genoa. The parents of Francesco and his brother Niccolò are not known, although based on the heraldic evidence of their inscriptions, Anthony Luttrell argues that their mother was a member of the Doria family.

Francesco enters the historical record as a freebooter or pirate. In 1354, Francesco and his crew landed on Tenedos. The island served at the time as residence to John V Palaiologos, one of three co-emperors to the throne of the Byzantine Empire, the others being his father-in-law John VI Kantakouzenos and brother-in-law Matthew Kantakouzenos. John V and his in-laws were in conflict at the time.

John V and Francesco entered an alliance to enable John to regain control of Constantinople. In return, he would be given the hand of Irene renamed Maria Palaiologina, a sister of John V, in marriage.

In early December 1354, Francesco led a fleet to Constantinople. They approached the city late at night and pretended that they needed assistance. They claimed that one of their ships was sinking and requested help in salvaging the cargo from shipwreck, and promised a share of it to the sentries of the city for their help. Seeing a chance to profit, the sentries opened a gate. Francesco then led about five hundred armed men through the gate, took command of the Walls of Constantinople, and roused the citizens from their sleep with shouts in favor of John V. Riots in favor of John V soon started. By 4 December 1354, John VI resigned his title and retired to a monastery.

== Lord ==
Francesco had managed to regain control of the capital for John V and removed his main rival from the political field. John V completed their agreement by making Francesco his brother-in-law.

On 17 July 1355, Francesco was further rewarded by the title of Archon (Lord) of Lesbos. John V had offered him the island as dowry for his sister.

In 1366, Francesco joined with Amadeus VI, Count of Savoy and Louis I of Hungary in a campaign to restore the stability of the Byzantine Empire. Together they captured Gallipoli from Murad I of the Ottoman Empire after two days of fighting. In October Amadeus and Gattilusio fleet going to Black Sea coast of Bulgaria and captured several castles and coastal towns like Skafida, Sozopol, Mesembria, Emona and Anchialo.

In 1369, Francesco accompanied John V on his trip to Rome, along with Demetrios Kydones, which concluded with John V personally accepting the Catholic faith on Thursday 18 October, in an unsuccessful effort to attract Western support for the greatly weakened Empire.

On 6 August 1384, an earthquake affected Lesbos. Francesco, and his two eldest sons, Andronico and Domenico, were all killed. In a letter, Kydones wrote from Constantinople soon after the event and describes how the two dead sons' prospective brides arrived from afar and searched among the ruins for the bodies of the intended husbands they had never seen. However the third son Jacopo survived and succeeded in the rule of Lesbos under the name Francesco II.

== Children ==
Francesco and Maria Palaiologina had:

- Andronico Gattilusio (c. 1356 – 6 August 1384)
- Domenico Gattilusio (c. 1358 – 6 August 1384)
- Francesco II Gattilusio (c. 1365 – 26 October 1404)

== Sources ==
- Miller, William (1921). Essays on the Latin Orient. Cambridge at the University Press.
- Wright, Christopher (2014). The Gattilusio Lordships and the Aegean World 1355-1462. Brill.

Francesco I Gattilusio Gattilusio Born: 14th century Died: 1384
New title	Lord of Lesbos; 1355–1384	Succeeded by Francesco II Gattilusio
