= Enez =

- Municipality
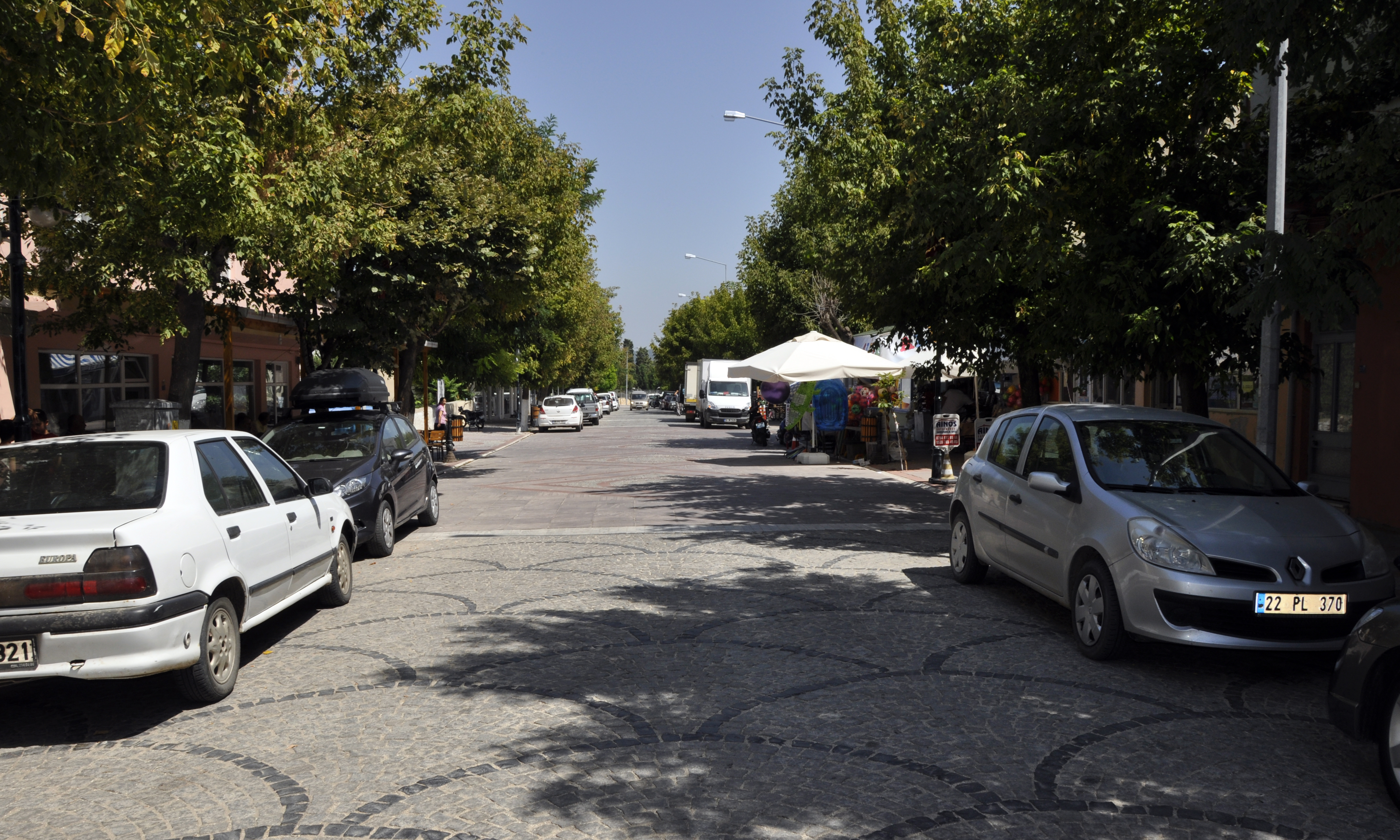

- Location within Turkey Location within Marmara
- Coordinates: 40°43′20″N 26°05′00″E
- Country: Turkey
- Province: Edirne
- District: Enez

Government
  - Mayor: Özkan Günenç (CHP)
- Population (2022): 4,301
- Time zone: UTC+3 (TRT)
- Area code: 0284
- Website: www.enez.bel.tr

Enez is a town in Edirne Province, in East Thrace, Turkey. The ancient name of the town was Ainos (Greek: Αίνος), Latinised as Aenus. It is the seat of Enez District. Its population is 4,301 (2022). The mayor is Özkan Günenç (CHP).

Enez consists of an old town centre, backing on to the Meriç/Evros river forming the border with neighbouring Greece; the harbour and Pırlanta Beach, 3 km southwest across the lagoon; and Altınkum Sahili (Golden Sands Beach), another 2 km south, which has been developed as a resort strip mainly catering for domestic tourists.

Despite Enez's proximity to the Greek border there is no crossing point by land here. To cross the border into Greece it is necessary to travel north to İpsala.

== Location ==
The town is located on the left (eastern) bank of the river Meriç (Greek: Evros, historically the Hebrus) where its estuary broadens to flow into the Gulf of Saros (the ancient Melas Gulf) and so into the Aegean Sea. Enez occupies a ridge of rock surrounded by broad marshes. In ancient Greek times it lay on a land route for trade from the Black Sea to the Aegean and was a port for transporting the wood and fruit produced in eastern and central Thrace.

== History ==
=== Antiquity ===
The mythical and eponymous founder of the ancient Greek city of Ainos/Aenus was said to be Aeneus, a son of the god Apollo and father of Cyzicus. Another mythical ruler, named Poltys, son of Poseidon, entertained Heracles when he came to Aenus. On that occasion, Heracles slew Poltys' insolent brother Sarpedon on the beach of Aenus. According to Strabo, Sarpedon is the name of the coastline near Aenus, so both Poltys and Sarpedon would appear to be eponyms.

The Suda suggests that the first settlers were Greeks from the Alopeconnesus and later more settlers came from Mytilene and Kyme which agrees with what Harpocration had written.

Presumably because of the similarity of the names, Virgil had Aeneas founding the city after the destruction of Troy. A surer sign of its antiquity comes from the Iliad, where Homer mentions that Peirous, who led Troy's Thracian allies, came from Aenus.

Herodotus (7.58) and Thucydides say Aenus was an Aeolian colony. Pseudo-Scymnus and Scymnus of Chios (696) say that the colonists came from Mytilene on Lesbos Island, while Stephanus Byzantius says they came (also?) from Cumae. According to Strabo (p. 319), a more ancient name for the place was Poltyobria while Stephanus says it was also called Apsinthus.

As a subject ally of Athens, Aenus provided peltasts at the Battle of Sphacteria in 425 BC and sent forces to the Sicilian Expedition in 415.

During the Hellenistic period Ainos changed hands multiple times. After a spell of Macedonian rule, the city passed to Lysimachos of Thrace after the death of Alexander the Great, and was subsequently taken by the Seleucid Empire after his defeat and death at the Battle of Corupedium in 281 BC. It then became a possession of the Ptolemaic Kingdom, when it was captured as a result of the Third Syrian War around 246 BC, it was subsequently captured by Philip V of Macedon in 200 BC, and later by Antiochus the Great, who lost it to the Romans in 185 BC, whereupon the Romans declared Aenus a free city. It was still a free city in the time of Pliny the Elder.

=== Byzantine period ===
The city is mentioned first among the cities of the province of Rhodope in the 6th-century Synecdemus of Hierocles. Under Justinian I (r. 527–565), the city wall was heightened and the previously unprotected shore fortified. In the middle Byzantine period, the city was part of the Theme of Thrace. In 1091, in the nearby hamlet of Lebounion, Emperor Alexios I Komnenos (r. 1081–1118) and his Cuman allies dealt a crushing defeat on the Pechenegs. In 1189, the town was plundered by soldiers of the Third Crusade under Duke Frederick of Swabia, with the inhabitants fleeing by ship. In the Partitio Romaniae of 1204, the city is attested as a distinct district (catepanikium de Eno). Under Latin rule, it was the seat of a Catholic bishop (a suffragan of Trajanopolis), while in a document of 1219 the Crusader barons Balduin de Aino and Goffred de Mairi are mentioned as lords of the city. In 1237 a Cuman raid reached the city, and in 1294 it was besieged by the Bulgarians under Constantine Tikh and his Tatar allies until the Byzantines released Sultan Kaykawus II. In June 1265 Emperor Michael VIII Palaiologos granted the Venetians the right to settle and trade in the city.

In 1347, John Palaiologos, Marquess of Montferrat, planned to take over the city. In 1351, John V Palaiologos demanded possession of Ainos from the senior emperor John VI Kantakouzeno. In the ensuing civil war, Palaiologos signed a treaty with Venice here on 10 October 1352, securing financial assistance in exchange for ceding the island of Tenedos as collateral. After Palaiologos' Serbian and Bulgarian allies were defeated by Kantakouzenos' Ottoman allies, Ainos was captured by Kantakouzenos loyalists and was placed under the rule of the exiled ruler of Epirus, Nikephoros II Orsini. Following the death of the Serbian emperor Stephen Dushan and his governor of Thessaly, Preljub, in 1355, however, Nikephoros abandoned the city and sailed to Thessaly to claim his ancestral inheritance. His admiral Limpidarios took over control of the city in his absence, despite the opposition of Nikephoros' wife Maria Kantakouzene (daughter of John VI). Maria locked herself in the city's citadel and continued to resist for a while, before agreeing to depart.

=== Ottoman period ===
With the gradual Ottoman conquest of Thrace in the 1360s and '70s, the city became a haven for the Greek population. From ca. 1384 on the city came under the rule of the Genoese Gattilusio family, beginning with Niccolo Gattilusio. The Gattilusi maintained their possession by exploiting the city's wealth, chiefly derived from salt pans and fisheries, and sending an annual tribute to the Ottomans. In 1408/9 Niccolo Gattilusio was deposed by his son Palamede, who ruled until his death in 1454. His younger son, Dorino II, squabbled with Helena Notaras, the widow of Niccolo's elder son Giorgio Gattilusio, and ruled for only two years. Helena Notaras appealed to the Ottoman Sultan Mehmed II who attacked the city from land and sea and forced it to surrender in January 1456.

In 1463 Ainos was given by Mehmed II to the deposed Despot of the Morea, Demetrios Palaiologos, as an appanage (along with parts of Thasos and Samothrace). He remained in possession of the town until 1467, when he fell into disgrace. The Venetians briefly captured the city in 1469.

=== Modern period ===
The town gave its name to the Enos-Midia line, which briefly marked the border of the Ottoman Empire in Europe (between the Kingdom of Bulgaria) in the disastrous aftermath of the First Balkan War. The border was shifted further northwest after the Turks made some limited gains in the Second Balkan War, recapturing the city of Edirne.

Enez had a large Greek population, and was affected from the 19th century onwards by ethnic conflicts and nationalistic aspirations. After the Turkish War of Independence (1919–23), the Treaty of Lausanne drew the current borders of Turkey and required Greek communities to leave Turkey while Turkish communities left Greece and Bulgaria.

Overnight Enez became a provincial backwater, a dead-end, up against an unfriendly border. It was a garrison town and military zone, off-limits to foreigners, right into the 21st century. Although foreigners are now allowed to visit, modern Enez makes a living largely from local tourism. Improved highways bring many weekenders from Istanbul. - the original town has a steady population while that of the beach strip soars in summer and drops to near zero in winter.

Enez remains the westernmost Turkish town on the European continent (excluding Imbros which is an island). The town of Alexandroupoli (Dedeağaç) lies just across the border with Greece but the two towns are separated by a swampland reserve and the Evros/Meriç River delta so that what should be a short journey actually takes about 1.5 hours. In the late 2010s and early 2020s the area became especially sensitive since it separates Turkey from the European Union. The tense situation around the border has tended to limit development in the area which has been a boon for the delta wildlife.

== Attractions ==
Enez was the site of a Byzantine Church of Hagia Sophia built in the 12th century (although some sources suggest the sixth century) but converted into a mosque during the reign of Sultan Mehmed II. The mosque was repaired several times in the 18th century but was left in ruins after an earthquake in 1965. Work began on a new restoration in 2016 and the mosque reopened for worship in 2021.

The mosque stands inside the remains of Enez Castle (Turkish: Enez Kalesi) which probably dates back to the reign of the Byzantine Emperor Justinian I and was probably built as a defence against raids from the Balkans.

The Has Yunus Bey Türbesi is a historic mosque and graveyard 300 m south of the castle which started life as a Byzantine chapel. Has Yunus Bey was the commander who captured Enez for the Ottomans and who was buried here.

The only historic monument in the resort area of Enez is the Sahil KervansarayI, the shell of an Ottoman caravanserai, which might have functioned as a customs office. It's believed to date back to the 16th century, when it probably stood on the coastline, now 500 m away. Local accounts suggest that it served a military function during the First World War, and it's therefore known as the İngiliz Kışlası ("English barracks").

The Kral Kızı Bazilikası is a ruined basilica on the western slope of the Taşaltı Lake, south-east of Enez, with its oldest layer dating back to the Roman period and its latest to the 12th century.

== Ecclesiastical history ==
The city was already an episcopal see in the 4th century under bishop Olympius who was driven from the see by the Arians in the reign of Constantius II. At first it was a suffragan of Trajanopolis, the capital and metropolitan see of the Roman province of Rhodope, but by the time of the Notitia Episcopatuum of Pseudo-Epiphanius (c. 640), it was an autocephalous archbishopric and rose to become a separate metropolitan see (without suffragans) at the end of the 11th century. Macarius took part in the Council of Chalcedon (451), Paul in the Second Council of Constantinople (553), George in the Trullan Council of 692, and John in the Photian Council of Constantinople (879). Another John took part in the Council of 1030/38, and Michael in the councils of 1092 and 1094.

Between 1285 and 1315, the see was awarded to the Metropolitan of Antioch in Pisidia. In 1361 the see was awarded to the Metropolitan of Makre, two years later to the Metropolitan of Sougdaia and in 1369 to the Bishop of Athyra. It remained a residential see of the Greek Orthodox Church until the 1923 population exchange between Greece and Turkey. No longer a residential bishopric, Aenus is now listed by the Catholic Church as a titular see.

== Notable people ==
- Python of Aenus, a Greek philosopher
- Heraclides of Aenus, a Greek philosopher

== See also ==
- List of ancient Greek cities

== Sources ==
- Soustal, Peter (1991). Tabula Imperii Byzantini, Band 6: Thrakien (Thrakē, Rodopē und Haimimontos) (in German). Vienna: Verlag der Österreichischen Akademie der Wissenschaften. pp. 170–173. ISBN 3-7001-1898-8.
