= Castle of Mytilene =

Castle on the Greek island of Lesbos

- Κάστρο της Μυτιλήνης
- Lesbos, North Aegean
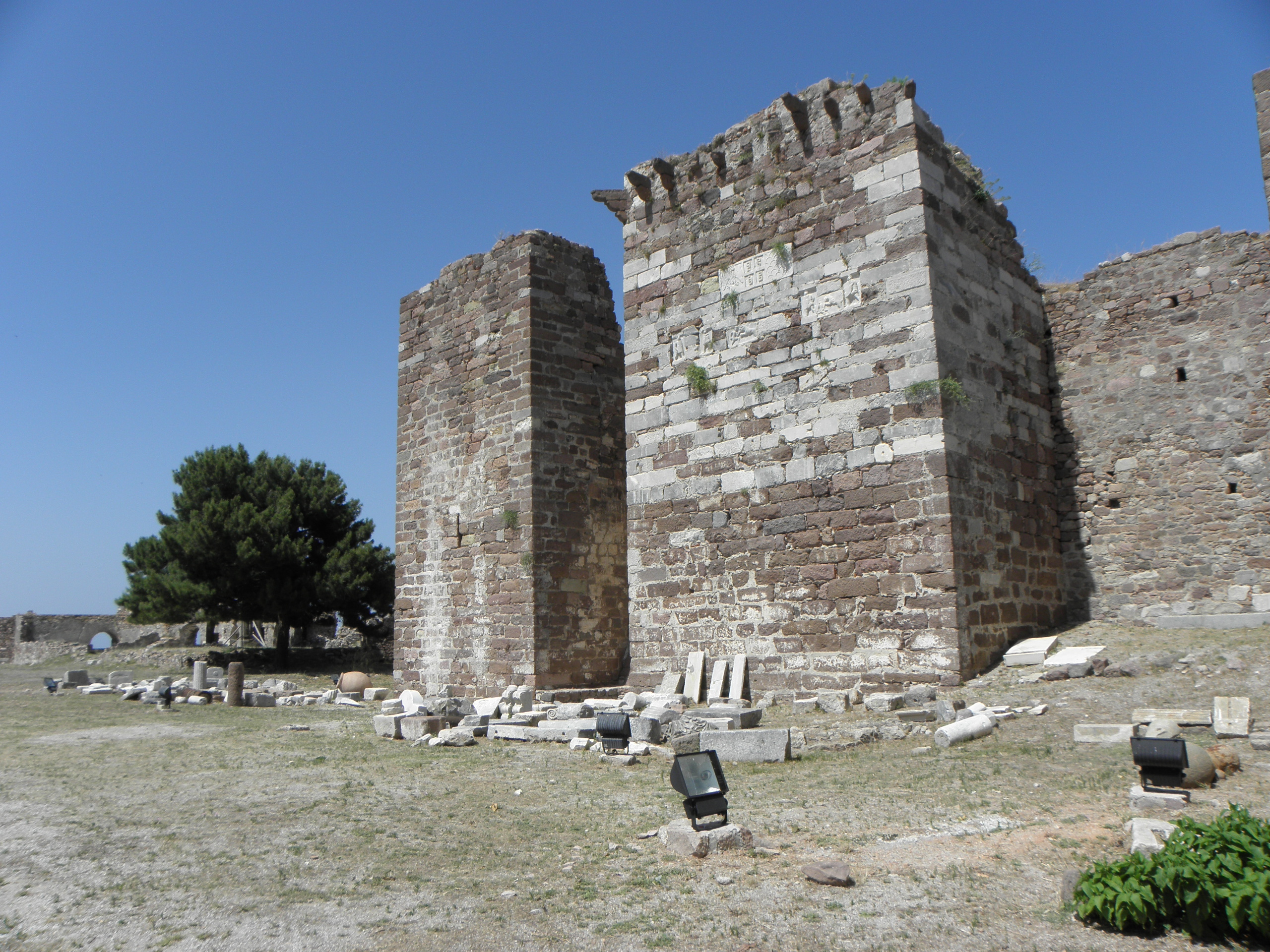
- Castle of Mytilene (2010)

Site information
- Type: hilltop citadel
- Owner: Greek Ministry of Culture
- Open to the public: Yes
- Condition: ruin

Location
- Location within Greece
- Coordinates: 39.112°N 26.562°E

Site history
- Built by: Byzantine Empire
- Materials: hewn stone (ashlar)

The Castle of Mytilene, also Fortress of Mytilene, is located in Mytilene on the Greek island of Lesbos, North Aegean. It is maintained in good condition and is one of the largest castles in the Mediterranean covering an area of 60 acres. The first castle on the site may have been erected during the time of Justinian I (ruled 527–565). The 6th-century castle may have been built on top of an already existent fortress. In the Late Middle Ages, the castle was the residence of Francesco I Gattilusio and his successors, especially the tower known today as the Queen's Tower. There is also strong evidence that the original acropolis on the site may have included a sanctuary to Demeter, Kore and Cybele.

== Geography ==
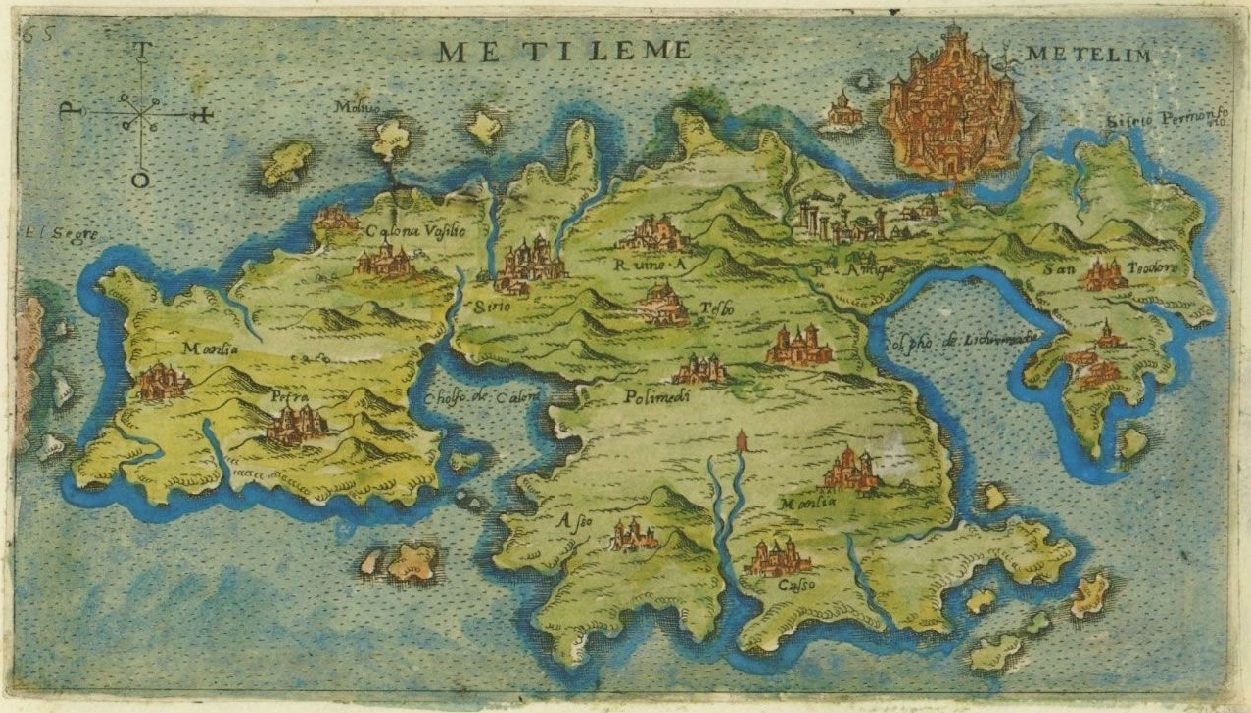
Map of Mytilene created in 1597 by the Venetian Giacomo (Jacomo) Franco

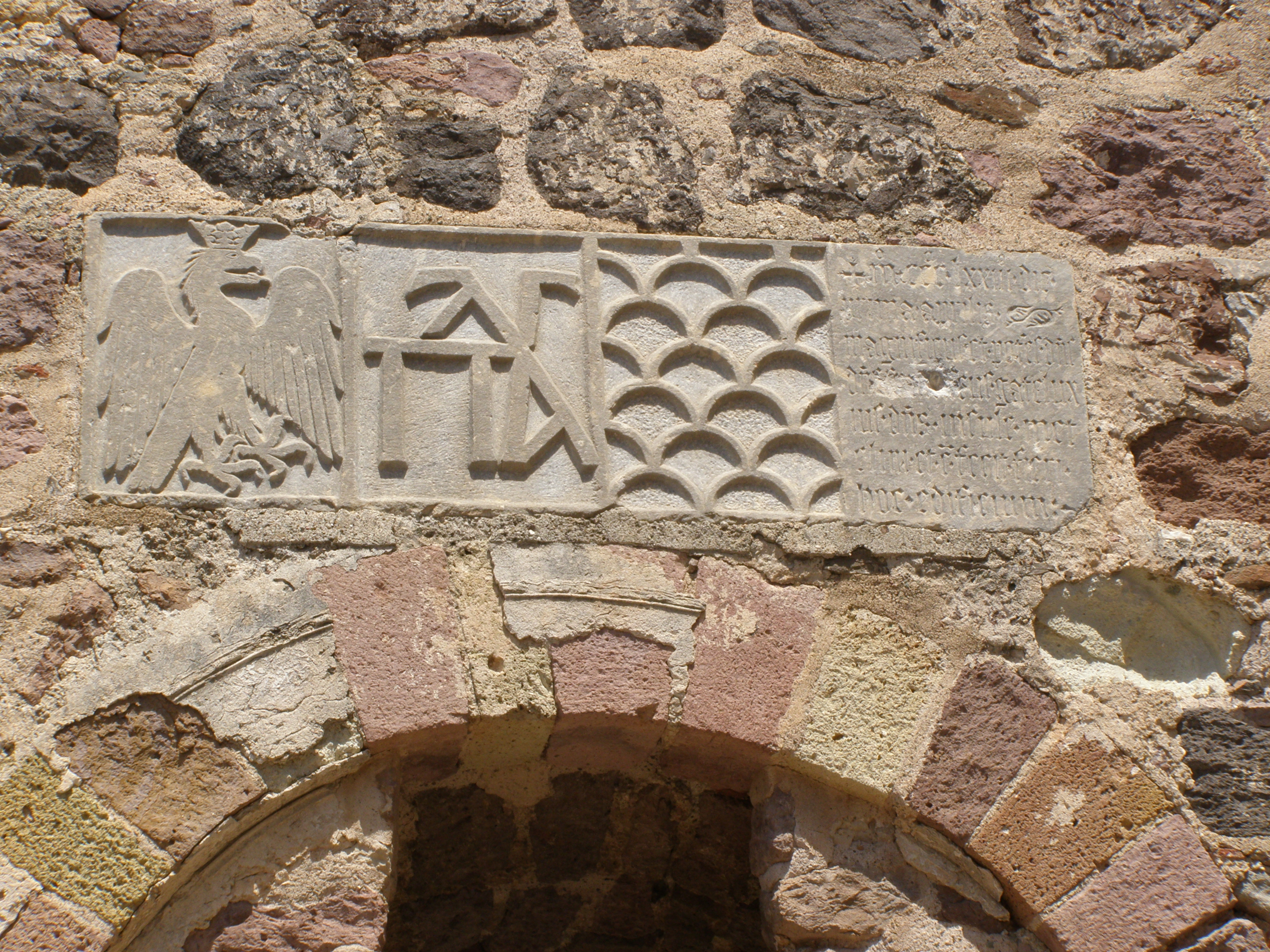
Relief at the Castle of Mytilene, showing the family cypher of the Palaiologoi (center left) and the Gattilusi coat of arms (center right)

The Mytilene castle fortress sits on a hill between the city’s northern and southern ports. From the writing of Homer, the island of Lesbos has been an organized city since 1054 BC. The early harbor of Mytilene was united during ancient times with a channel 700 meters long and 30 meters wide. The Greek word Εύριπος or Euripus is a commonly used term when referring to a strait. The strait allowed ancient 3 rower or more sail boats called Trireme. The boats that passed were 34 meters and had depth of 4 meters. The castle at this point was east of the island. Castle island was inhabited by people.

The areas of the city that were densely populated connected the two bodies of land with marble bridges, one of which can still be seen under a modern building. They usually followed a curved line. The straight begin at the old market called Epano Skala. It was also close to Metropolis Street and ended at the Southern Harbor. One could argue that the channel transversed what is now called Ermoo Street. By the 16th century, if not earlier, the channel was filled in.

== History of the castle ==
The original nucleus of the fortress, designed in Byzantine times, is believed to have been built on top of the ancient acropolis. According to an old text found in the language Aeolic of Lesbos. Mytilene was spelled in many different styles two such examples were Mytileanaean and as referenced by Aristotle Maloeis, which was a harbor in Lesbos. According to the same text a Temple of Apollo existed in Maloeis as we learn from Thucydides. Temples usually were erected at the Acropolis. A Temple of Apollo may have existed within the Castle infrastructure. Another Case was made by Susan-Marie Cronkite in her Doctoral thesis that a Sanctuary of Demeter may have rested at the Acropolis throughout Mytilene's history.

The city flourished and was in League with the King of Macedon, Lesbos joined a revolt against Rome in the Mithridatic Wars and in 88 BC the Romans destroyed Mytilene and the Temple of Mytilene assumed Apollo's Temple. They extended domination over the whole island. Pompey later gave Mytilene autonomy, which Emperor Vespasian revoked in 70 AD but Emperor Hadrian Later restored. Theophanes of Mytilene lived in the 1st century, he was a historian and intellectual who was friends with Pompey according to Plutarch he granted freedoms to Mytilene for Theophanes sake. According to excavations both in the Castle of Mytilene and elsewhere in the town archeologists have uncovered a variety bronze coins Commemorating Theophanes portrait.

The first significant alterations to the fortress were made by Francesco I Gattilusio in 1373. The castle was bombarded and captured by the Ottomans in 1462. In 1501, Sultan Bayezid II repaired the damage suffered by the Castle during the Ottoman–Venetian War (1499–1503), and built two large round towers with cannon and developed new walls.

New construction to modernize the castle was undertaken in 1643-1644 by Bekir Pasha, in the days of Sultan Ibrahim Khan, perhaps in view of the Cretan War (1645–69) or because of destruction by earthquake. They carried out repairs to the walls, erecting a new wall in front of the existing medieval wall. In front of these new structures a deep wide moat was created.

Other changes and additions followed, the most important of which was made in 1677 by the Ottomans. The lower north sections of the fortifications were added. The Ancient Theatre of Mytilene was used for construction materials. In 1756 Admiral Kuramadji added a polygonal tower near the harbor of Epano Skala.

During the 19th century the function and character of the castle changed. The castle exhibited a more military character, as indicated by the barracks built near the madrasa and the neighboring gunpowder vault. Its walls, however, were not thick or strong enough to withstand attack by cannons, especially from the seaward side.

The island was captured by Greece during the First Balkan War, on November 8, 1912. After 1912 the castle was used as a source of building material to construct refugee housing which gradually brought about its ruin. The intramural segment continued to be inhabited until shortly after the Second World War. The castle is currently used for local festivals in the summer and tourist tours it is declared a historical site.

== Architecture ==
From a morphological perspective, the castle is divided into three sections:

- The Acropolis or Upper Castle lies in the north and is the highest point of the hill; there is a Thesmophorion and the Castle of Francesco I Gattilusio
- The Middle Castle, mostly built by Francesco I Gattilusio but was modified by the Ottomans.
- The Lower Castle on the northwest side was added by the Ottomans in 1644; the lower portion has a hammam (bathhouse).

In the Upper Castle, Francesco Gattilusio's additions included square stone tower, decorated with the family coats of arms of the Gattilusi and the Palaiologoi. It was also known as the Queen’s Tower. The middle Castle was changed by Francesco I Gattilusio. During the Ottoman period there were several additions, including Kulé Mosque; an Ottoman Seminary; Tekke Islamic Monastery, the Madrasa, an imaret, a bath-house, the gunpowder store, Cistern, and a Fountain which survive to the present day. The Ottomans also added the Orta Kapu (Ottoman gate).

The interior of the fortress is being excavated by the Canadian Archaeological Institute, which has unearthed buildings from the Archaic and Classical periods as well as remains dating from medieval times. In 2000, reconstruction began on the Orta Kapi (west-central gate) and the Cistern, and restoration is currently underway on the monument’s interior. In recent years, a space was created inside the fortress to host summer cultural events.

== Gallery ==
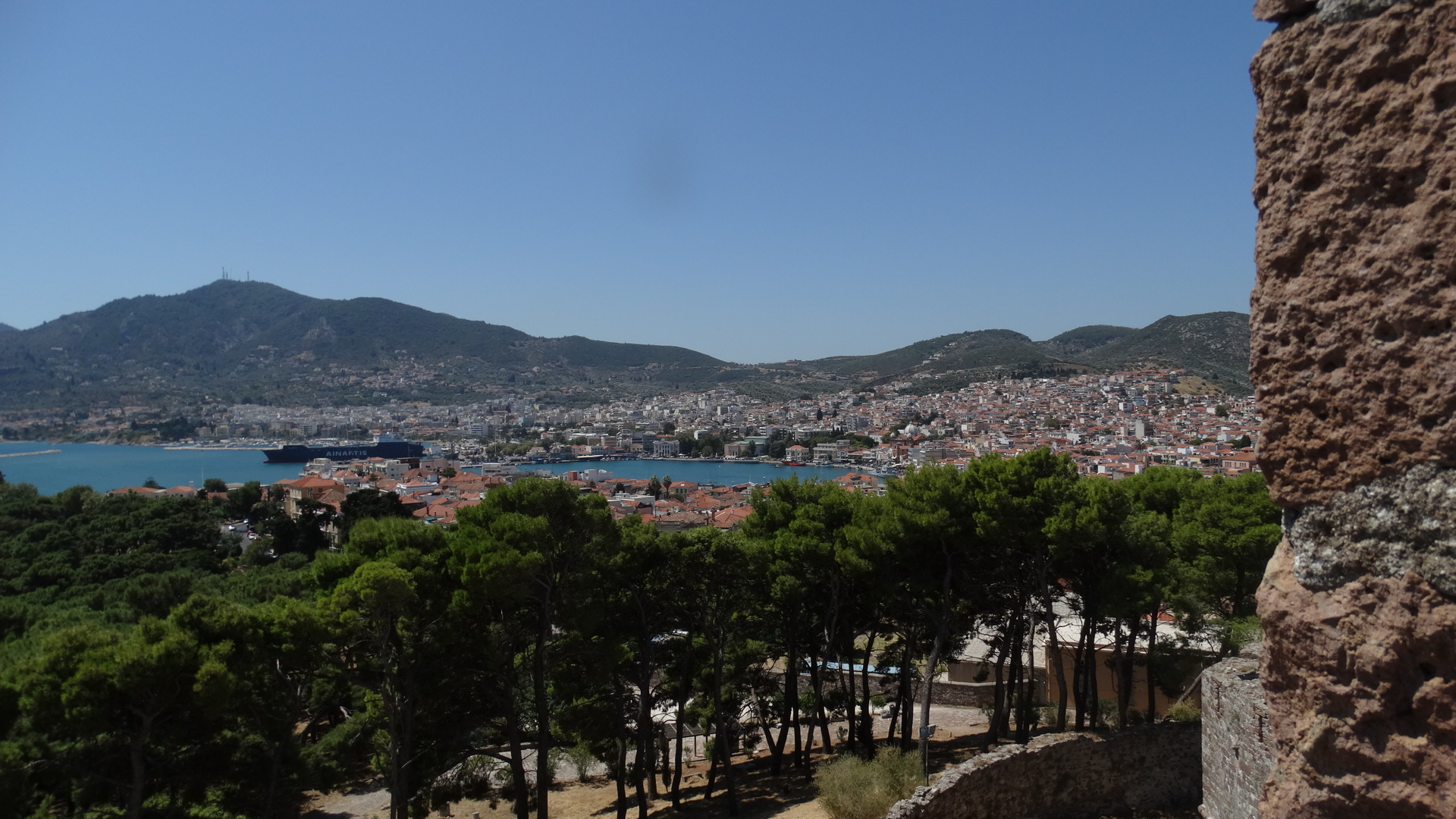
View from the castle

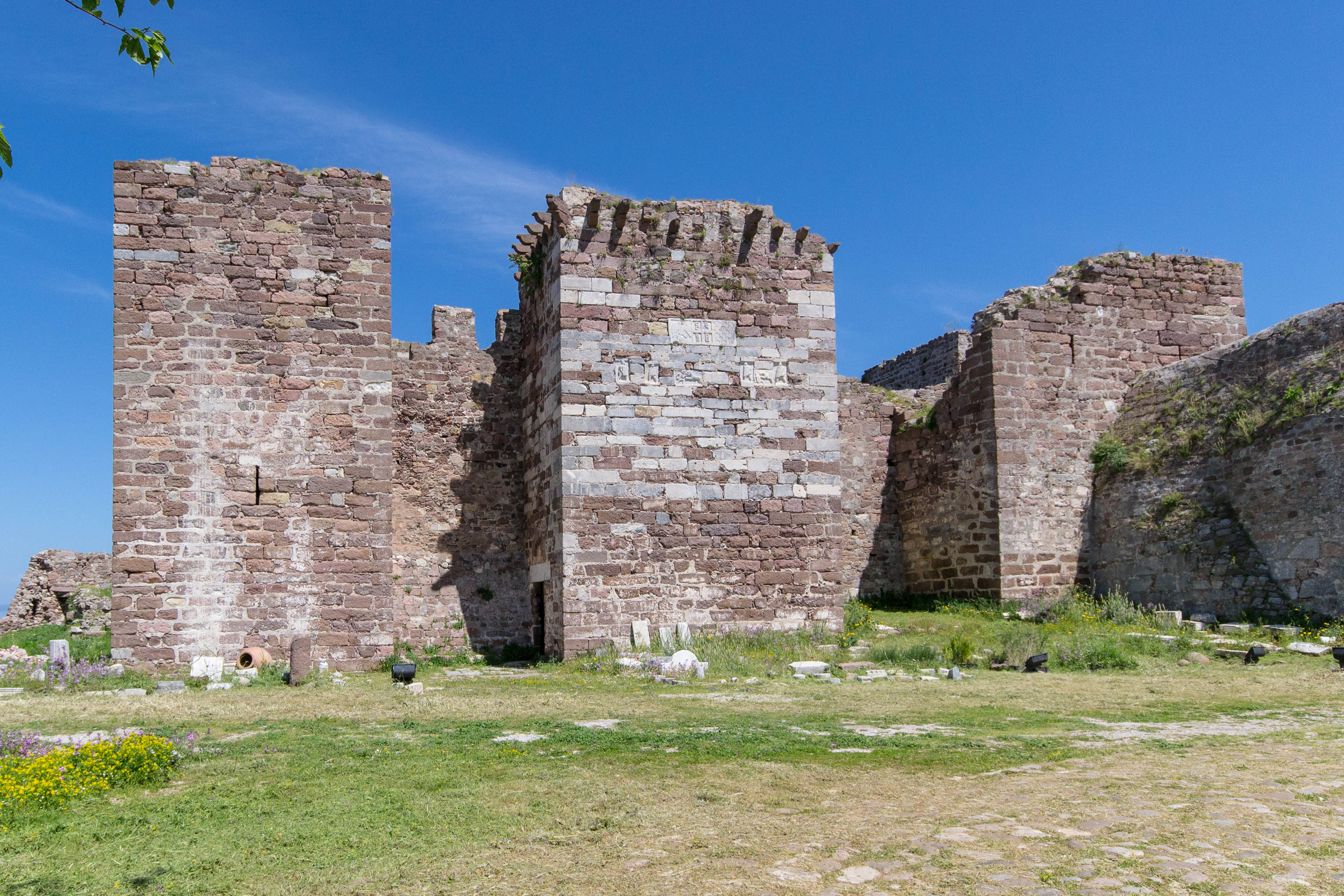
Castle of Mytilene

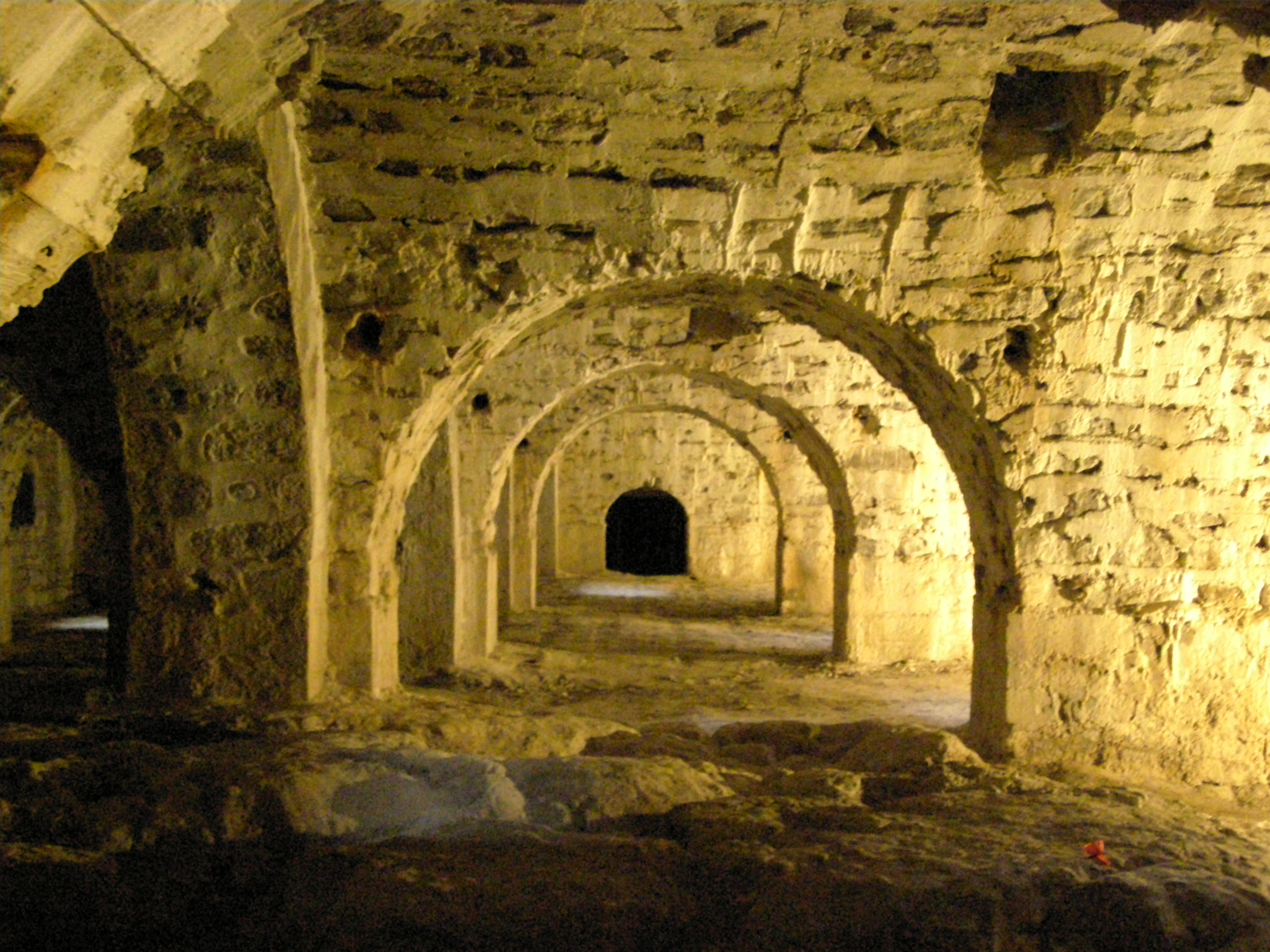
Interior

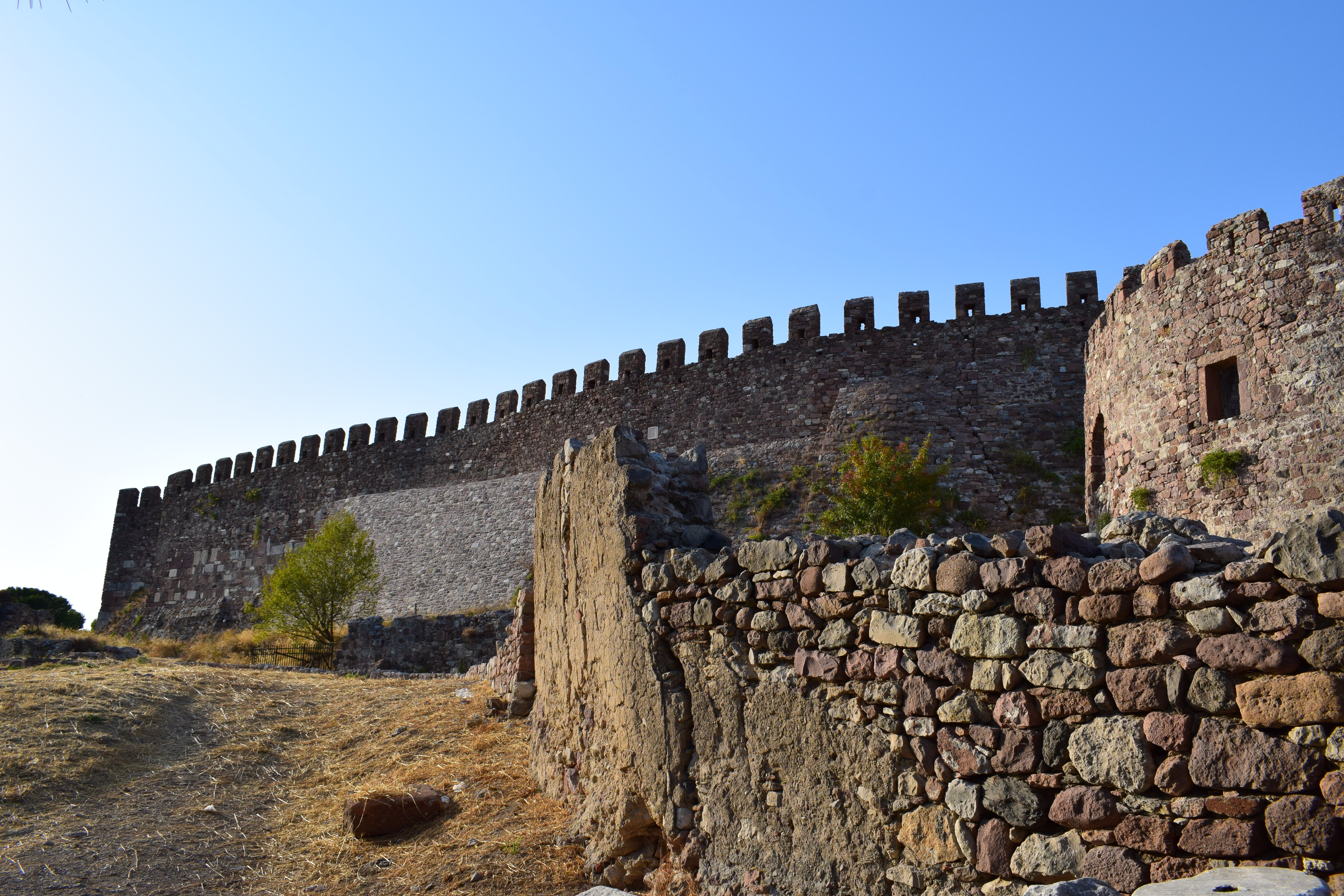
Castle of Mytilene

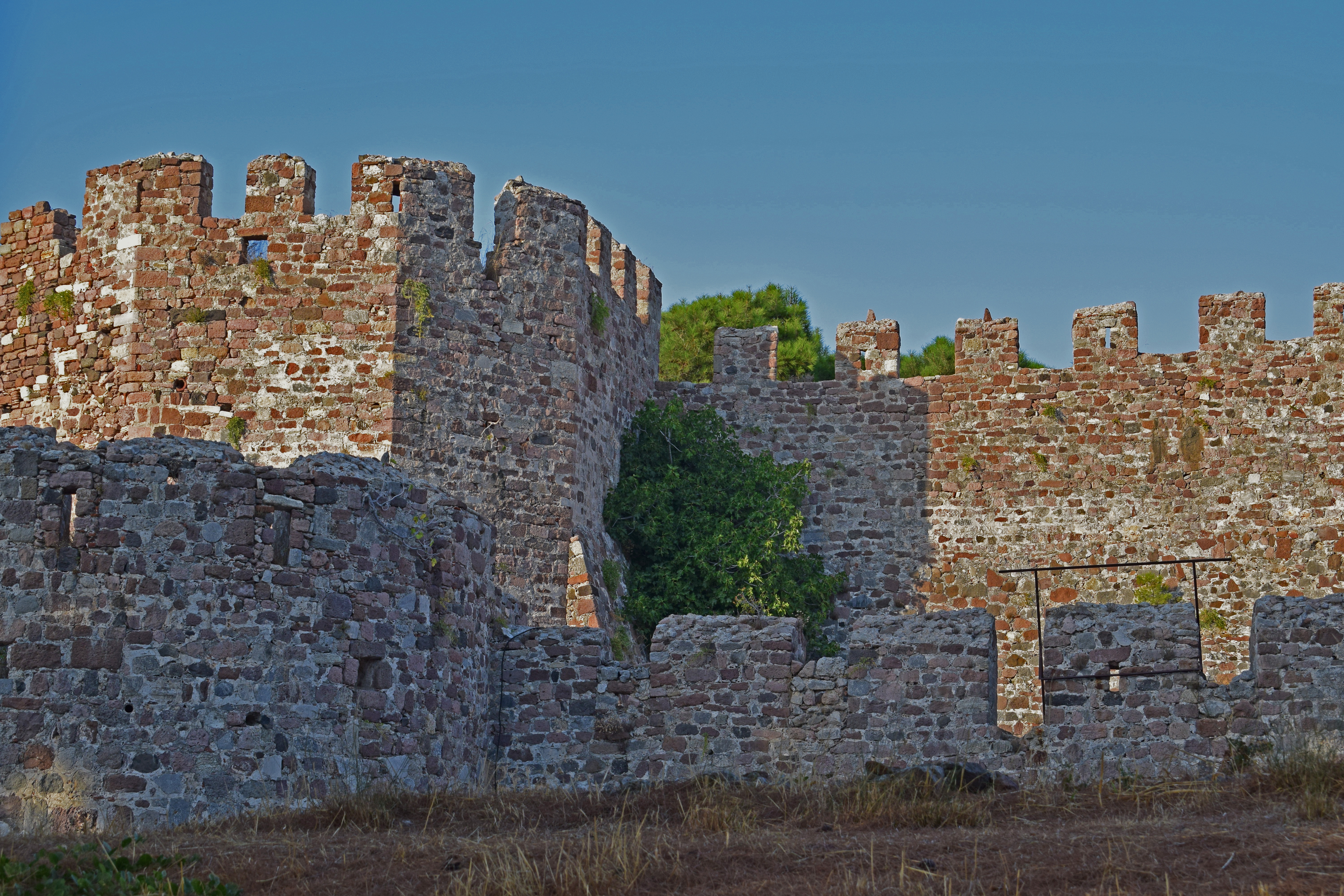
Walls

== See also ==
- Castle of Molyvos
- Castle of Sigri
- The Bridge at Kremasti
