= Alexios Philanthropenos (disambiguation) =

Alexios Philanthropenos (c. 1270–1340s) was a Byzantine nobleman and general.

Alexios Philanthropenos may also refer to:

- Alexios Angelos Philanthropenos, Byzantine Greek nobleman
- Alexios Doukas Philanthropenos (died c. 1275), Byzantine nobleman and admiral
- Alexios Laskaris Philanthropenos, Byzantine official and governor
