= Red Apple Tree =

Legendary place

Kokkini Milia (Greek: Κόκκινη Μηλιά, meaning: Red Apple Tree) is Greek tradition, is a legendary place to which the Turks will be expelled from Constantinople (modern Istanbul). The legend recounts the future retaking of Constantinople by the Greeks, and the restoration of the last Byzantine emperor, Constantine XI Palaiologos, who has been sleeping in the Golden Gate (Constantinople) of the Theodosian walls of Constantinople as the Marble King, who will ascend the throne and worship at the church of Hagia Sophia.

== Corresponding to the Monodendrio of the Byzantine prophecies ==
The Red Apple Tree corresponds to Monodendrio of the pre-Fall Byzantine oracles and the prophecies told during the dangerous sieges faced by Constantinople. However, how and when Monodendrio was replaced by the Red Apple Tree and what the latter was based on remains unknown.

== Turkish legend of the Red Apple ==
It is likely relevant to the Turkish legend of the Red Apple (Kızıl Elma), which symbolizes the ultimate goal of conquest. Constantinople was first labelled as the Red Apple, followed by Rome, Vienna and Moscow.

== Red Apple Coalition ==
The legend and the term are also used in the modern era. Left and right-wing nationalists who fear a break-up of Turkey if it joins the European Union call themselves the "Red Apple Coalition". In early 2018, the legend was invoked by Turkish President Recep Tayyip Erdoğan during the Turkish military operation against Kurds in Syria’s Afrin Region.
