= Alexios Laskaris Philanthropenos =

- Citizenship: Byzantine Empire
- Years active: 1429–1449
- Title: governor (kephale) of Vostitza and Patras

Alexios Laskaris Philanthropenos (Greek: Ἀλέξιος Λάσκαρις Φιλανθρωπηνός; fl. 1429–1449) was a senior Byzantine official and governor in the Despotate of the Morea during the last decades of the Empire's existence.

He first appears in 1429, as governor (kephale) of Vostitza (modern Aigio), taking part in the siege of Patras by the Despot of the Morea (and later last Byzantine Emperor) Constantine Palaiologos. An opponent of the Union of the Churches, he corresponded with Gennadios Scholarios and Bessarion (who composed a treatise on the procession of the Holy Spirit for him), and took part in the 1439 Council of Florence, but left it early. In 1446 he was named kephale of Patras. Constantine Palaiologos sent him to Emperor John VIII Palaiologos in Constantinople in autumn 1448 to settle a dispute with his brother Thomas Palaiologos, but before Alexios arrived at the capital, he learned that the Emperor had died. In December he set out for Mistra along with Manuel Iagaris Palaiologos to bring the news of John's death and Constantine's proclamation as Emperor and oversee his coronation (January 1449).

== Sources ==
- Trapp, Erich; Beyer, Hans-Veit; Walther, Rainer; Sturm-Schnabl, Katja; Kislinger, Ewald; Leontiadis, Ioannis; Kaplaneres, Sokrates (1976–1996). Prosopographisches Lexikon der Palaiologenzeit (in German). Vienna: Verlag der Österreichischen Akademie der Wissenschaften. ISBN 3-7001-3003-1.
