= Potapovich =

Potapovich (Russian: Потапович) is a Russian patronymic surname and Russian patronymic derived from the given name Potap (from Greek Patapios). Belarusian equivalent: Patapovich, Ukrainian: Potapovych, Polish: Potapowicz. Notable people with the surname include:

- Igor Potapovich, Kazakhstani pole vaulter
- Pavel Potapovich, Russian steeplechase runner

== See also ==
- Potapov
