= John VII Palaiologos =

Byzantine emperor in 1390

- Emperor and Autocrat of the Romans
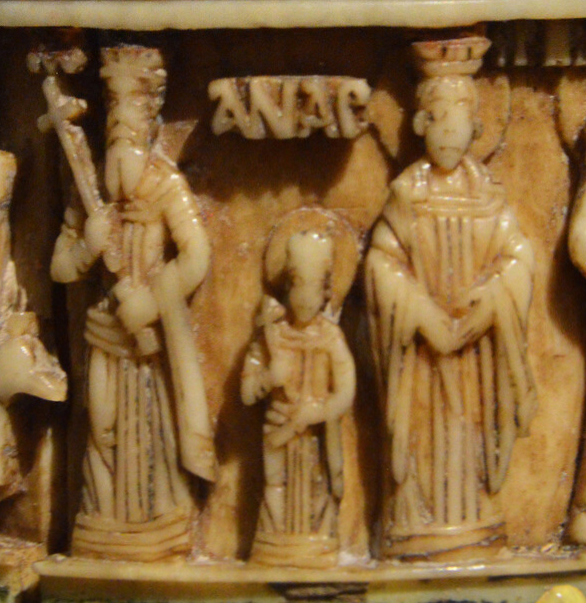
- John VII (left) alongside his son Andronikos V Palaiologos and wife Irene Gattilusio from an ivory pyxis from Thessalonica

Byzantine emperor
- Reign: 14 April – 17 September 1390
- Predecessor: John V Palaiologos
- Successor: John V Palaiologos
- Proclamation: 1377 (as co-emperor)

Byzantine emperor in Thessalonica
- Reign: 1403 – 22 September 1408
- Predecessor: Manuel II Palaiologos (until 1387)
- Successor: Andronikos Palaiologos (as Despot of Thessalonica)
- Co-emperor: Andronikos V Palaiologos (1403–1407)

Byzantine emperor in Selymbria
- Reign: 1385 – 1403
- Predecessor: Andronikos IV Palaiologos
- Born: 1370
- Died: 22 September 1408 (aged 38); Thessalonica
- Spouse: Irene Gattilusio
- Issue: Andronikos V Palaiologos
- Dynasty: Palaiologos
- Father: Andronikos IV Palaiologos
- Mother: Keratsa of Bulgaria

John VII Palaiologos or Palaeologus (Greek: Ἰωάννης Παλαιολόγος, romanized: Iōánnēs Palaiológos; 1370 – 22 September 1408) was Byzantine emperor for five months in 1390, from 14 April to 17 September. A handful of sources suggest that John VII sometimes used the name Andronikos (Greek: Ἀνδρόνικος, romanized: Andrónikos), possibly to honour the memory of his father, Andronikos IV Palaiologos, though he reigned under his birth name.

Andronikos IV was the firstborn son of Emperor John V Palaiologos (r. 1341–1391), and had thus been the heir to the throne. After a failed rebellion in 1373, Andronikos IV was imprisoned and partially blinded, the same punishment possibly being carried out on John VII, then only three years old. Andronikos IV escaped in 1376 and successfully took Constantinople, ruling as emperor until 1379. John VII served as co-emperor during this time, possibly being appointed in 1377. Though deposed in 1379 by his brother Manuel II Palaiologos and their father John V, Andronikos IV never renounced his claims. To prevent further conflict, it was agreed in 1381 that Andronikos IV was to succeed John V, making John VII second-in-line to the throne.

Upon Andronikos IV's death in 1385, John VII inherited his claims. Despite the previous agreement, Manuel was seen by John V as the favoured successor. John VII rebelled against John V and successfully seized Constantinople in 1390. After just five months, Manuel succeeded in deposing his nephew with the help of the Ottomans and the Knights Hospitaller. Upon John V's death in 1391, Manuel succeeded him as emperor. Still possessing a powerful network of allies, John VII never surrendered his claim to be the legitimate emperor, and the tense relationship between him and his uncle brought the empire close to civil war several times. Though they were only honoured to a limited extent by Manuel, several agreements in regards to status and the line of succession were made between the two in order to avoid conflict, certifying that John VII remained co-emperor and was to succeed Manuel upon his death.

In 1394, the Ottoman sultan Bayezid I besieged Constantinople. Manuel left the city in 1399 to travel around Western Europe in search for military aid, and entrusted John VII with serving as regent in Constantinople, overseeing its defense. Despite allegations of conspiring with the Ottomans, John VII held the city loyally for the entire duration of Manuel's three and a half years-long journey, refusing to surrender it to Bayezid. The threat to Constantinople ended with Bayezid's defeat against the Timurids at the Battle of Ankara in 1402. In the aftermath of this battle, John VII negotiated a favourable treaty with one of Bayezid's sons, Süleyman Çelebi, which ensured that the important city of Thessalonica, lost to the Ottomans in 1387 due to the actions of Manuel, was returned to imperial control. Despite John VII's loyal service, Manuel sent him away in disgrace once he returned in 1403, and the two were once more enemies. This feud proved to be brief, as they were reconciled a few months later and a new agreement was made, in which John VII was allowed to take possession of Thessalonica and was acknowledged with the full imperial title. From 1403 until his death in 1408, John VII thus ruled in Thessalonica as "Emperor of All Thessaly", with his own separate imperial court. The Thessalonians considered him an able ruler, and his work with local church affairs and improving the city's defensive structures garnered him a positive remembrance.

== Biography ==
=== Background and early life ===
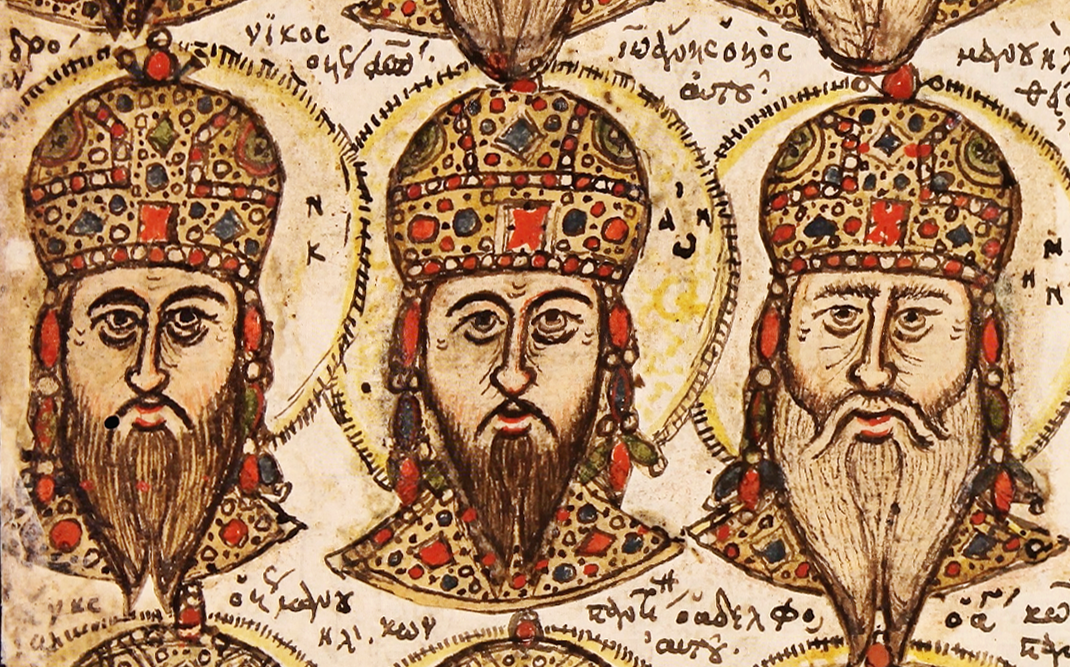
15th-century portraits of Andronikos IV, John VII and Manuel II (from a 15th-century codex containing a copy of the Extracts of History by Joannes Zonaras)

John VII Palaiologos was born in 1370 as the only son (Note: It is generally accepted that John VII was Andronikos IV's only son. Some sources suggest that Andronikos IV had younger sons as well. A passage from the Histories of Laonikos Chalkokondyles suggests that Andronikos IV had the sons Andronikos (probably John VII, who appears to have periodically assumed this name), Demetrios, Manuel and Theodore. The 15th-century Ottoman historian Neşri, while discussing the war in 1413 between Ottoman princes Musa Çelebi and Mehmed Çelebi, wrote that among Mehmed's supporters were a "son of the blind prince". As the "blind prince" was probably Andronikos IV, and John VII had been dead for five years at this point, this might be a reference to another of Andronikos IV's sons. The Castilian traveller Ruy González de Clavijo, who visited Constantinople, records that he met Demetrios, son of Andronikos IV. Though it is clear from Clavijo's account that he actually met John VIII Palaiologos, the son of Manuel II Palaiologos, the repetition of the name Demetrios, also used by Chalkokondyles for one of Andronikos IV's sons, is a strange coincidence.) of Andronikos IV Palaiologos and Keratsa of Bulgaria, a daughter of Emperor Ivan Alexander of Bulgaria. Andronikos IV was the first-born son of Emperor John V Palaiologos (r. 1341–1391) and thus the legitimate heir to the Byzantine throne.

The Palaiologos dynasty, in power since 1259/1261, was often plagued by infighting, with the emperors and princes of the family often being unable to cooperate among themselves, to the detriment of the empire. The main enemy of the Byzantines at this time was the Ottoman Empire, which throughout the 14th century conquered vast swaths of former imperial territory. John V had even agreed to serve the Ottoman sultan Murad I (r. 1362–1389) as a tributary vassal. At this time, despite geopolitical adversity, Byzantine and Ottoman aristocrats were in close contact with each other.

While John was serving on an Ottoman campaign in Anatolia, as per his vassalage agreement with Murad I, Andronikos and one of Murad I's sons, Savcı Bey, co-ordinated simultaneous revolts against their fathers. The two princes were defeated, captured and imprisoned within a few months, as their fathers joined forces to put down the revolts. Andronikos and Savcı suffered harsh punishment. Savcı was blinded and beheaded by Murad I, and though the sultan ordered John V to blind his son as well, the Byzantine emperor was reluctant, only partially following through. Andronikos was only partially blinded, apparently losing just one of his eyes. Some sources suggest that Andronikos's infant son John, the later John VII, only three years old at the time, was also partially blinded in the same way. Furthermore, Andronikos lost his right of succession to the throne, with his younger brother, Manuel II Palaiologos, being designated as heir by John V instead.

Imprisoned with his family in the Prison of Anemas in Constantinople, Andronikos escaped in July 1376, together with his wife and son, to Galata, a colony of the Republic of Genoa on the other side of the Golden Horn, where he was enthusiastically received by the Genoese. The Genoese preferred Andronikos over John V, due to the latter having recently granted the island of Tenedos to their rival, the Republic of Venice, thus hurting their commercial interests. Andronikos also retained the support of a large fraction of Byzantine society, despite his rebellious actions, and successfully took Constantinople on 12 August that same year, with Genoese and Ottoman support. John V and Manuel were imprisoned, and Andronikos ruled as emperor for three years before they escaped and deposed him. During his father's reign (12 August 1376 – 1 July 1379), John VII was proclaimed co-emperor, probably in 1377. Even after being deposed, Andronikos never renounced his claim to the throne, residing in Galata and openly declaring his intentions to retake the capital.

The standoff between Andronikos and the emperors in Constantinople lasted until 1381, when an agreement was reached that Andronikos and his son John were to be John V's successors as emperors. Furthermore, Andronikos was once more recognised as junior co-emperor and was allowed to retain and use the title of basileus (emperor). Andronikos also received lands around Selymbria as an appanage in 1382.

Andronikos predeceased John V, dying on 25 or 28 June 1385. John VII inherited his father's lands around Selymbria and, as per the 1381 agreement, also inherited the right to use the title basileus, becoming a junior co-emperor of the Byzantine Empire. He also inherited his father's claim to be John V's legitimate heir. From his position as junior emperor, John VII received support from the Ottoman Empire, especially from the time of Bayezid I's accession (1389) onwards, and from the Genoese. The Genoese support did not escape the attention of John V. At some point between 1387 and 1391, John V is recorded as having complained to the Genoese that the inhabitants of Galata were acclaiming and saluting John VII as if he were the senior emperor, while denying John V the appropriate honours.

=== Usurpation of the throne and reign ===
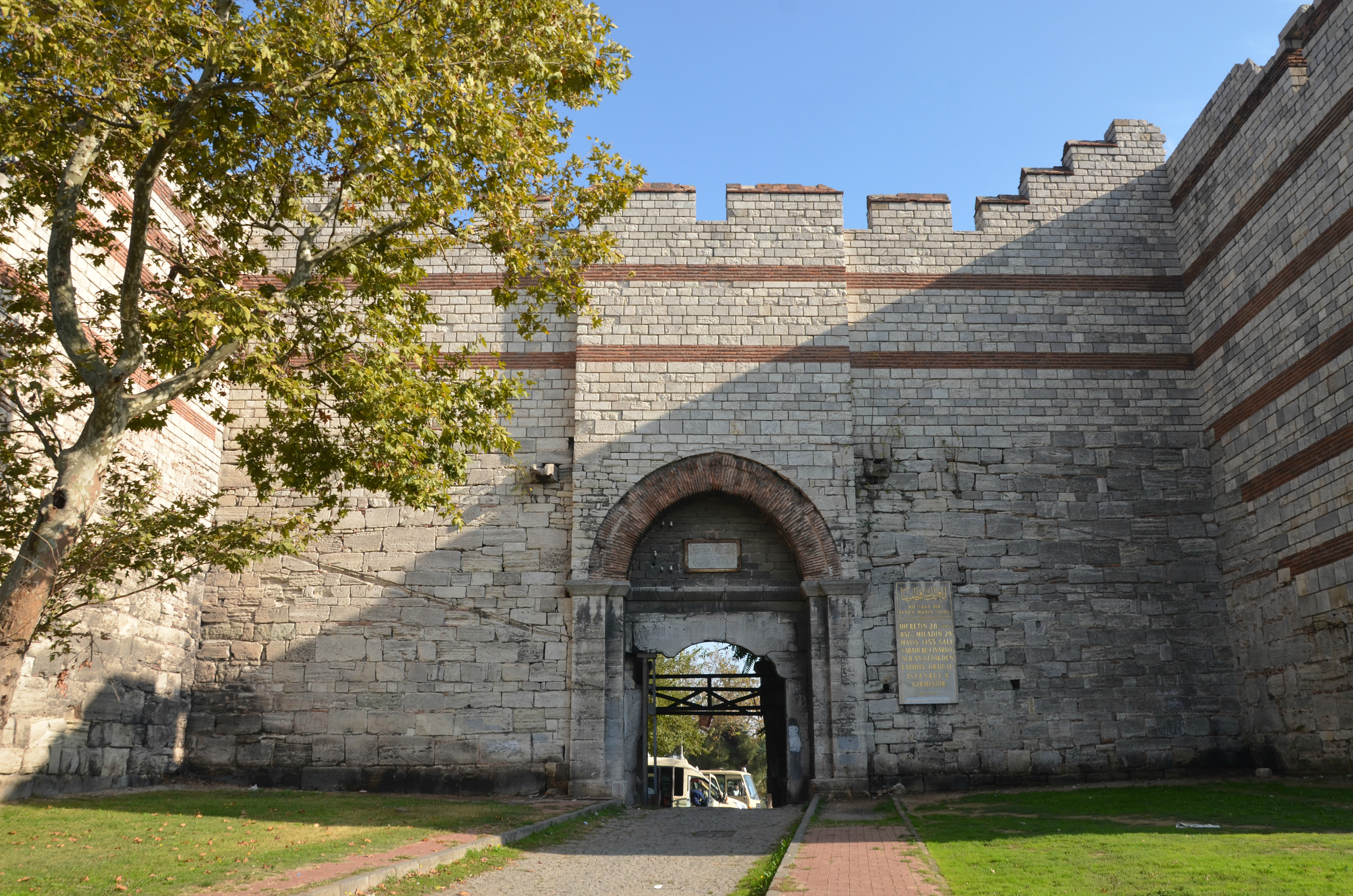
The Gate of Charisius, through which John VII entered Constantinople on 14 April 1390

Political map of the eastern Mediterranean in 1389

Despite the agreement of 1381, which explicitly stated that John VII was the legitimate successor, and Manuel having shown some rebellious tendencies himself, (Note: Manuel, upset about being excluded from the succession in 1381, fled to Thessalonica, where he established his power over much of Thessaly and Epirus. Murad I saw Manuel as a dangerous enemy, having broken his father's oath of vassalage to the Ottomans. The Ottomans thus attacked Thessalonica, and though Manuel appeared to want to make a stand against the Ottoman army, the citizens of Thessalonica seemed willing to surrender the city and John V chose to not send any help to his son. In 1387, the Ottomans entered the city without opposition. Manuel is later recorded as a supplicant at the Ottoman court, but was eventually reconciled with his father.) Manuel remained John V's favoured heir and represented John VII's main obstacle on the way to the throne. When Manuel was away campaigning in Anatolia in 1390, John VII, twenty years old, seized the moment and proclaimed himself sole emperor, laying siege to Constantinople. According to the contemporary Russian chronicler Ignatius of Smolensk, 1390 had seen a strong current of opinion in John VII's favour. John VII had secured the support of the Ottoman sultan Bayezid I and the Genoese; shortly before the siege (probably in late 1389) he had even travelled to Genoa in person to rally support. As he travelled back to the Byzantine Empire by land, it is possible that John VII passed through Bulgaria, where he might also have sought the assistance of Ivan Sratsimir and Ivan Shishman, Tsars of Bulgaria in Vidin and Tarnovo, respectively.

In addition to his external allies, a large percentage of the population within Constantinople also supported John VII, and might even have approved of subtle Ottoman intervention in the succession. John entered the city on 14 April 1390, his brief siege having ended through a group of commoners opening the Gate of Charisius, without struggle, and letting him in. Though some coercion was used, before long everyone inside the city had recognised and acclaimed John VII as emperor, submitting to his rule.

There is some contemporary evidence that John VII used the name Andronikos at the time of his usurpation. Ignatius of Smolensk, eyewitness to the event, wrote that the soldiers in John VII's service shouted the acclamation "Polla ta eti Andronikou!", rather than the expected "Polla ta eti Ioannou!" and records of the registers of expenses in Galata in 1390 mention that the emperor in Constantinople at the time was Andronico Paleologo. (Note: There is also some scant later evidence. A short chronicle by an anonymous author covering the years 1221–1460, though not as reliable as the other sources due to its greater distance in time, mentions that the regent left in Constantinople during Manuel II Palaiologos's journey to Western Europe 1399–1403 (John VII) was his brother (an obvious error) and was named Andronikos.) It is possible that John VII changed his name to Andronikos upon his father's death in 1385 to honour his memory, or adopted it only in 1390, in order to avoid confusion and facilitate his usurpation of the throne. If his soldiers and the people of Constantinople were to depose an emperor named John and proclaim another of the same name, the entire affair could be conducted in bewilderment. By using the name Andronikos, any such issues would be avoided. During his actual reign as emperor, after successfully taking the throne, John VII does not appear to have used the second name, reigning under his birth name. In treaties he signed he is referred to as John, and contemporary Byzantine authors also consistently refer to him by his birth name, ignoring any second name for him.

The few activities recorded to have been conducted during John VII's brief reign suggest that he believed that he was going to rule for a long time. In June, he signed a treaty with Venice and throughout his time as emperor he issued prostagmata (imperial decisions/commands) and minted coins. John VII is also recorded to have supported the restoration of Macarius to the Patriarchate of Constantinople. Macarius had been Patriarch of Constantinople during the reign of John VII's father, in 1376–1379.

John VII's reign ended in the same year as it had begun, when Manuel returned from his campaign. With the support of the Knights Hospitaller and the Ottomans, Manuel deposed John VII, who had ruled just five months, on 17 September and restored the rule of John V. After helping Manuel retake the city for his father, sultan Bayezid I forced him to live at the Ottoman court, acting as a submissive vassal.

=== Governor in Selymbria and pretensions ===
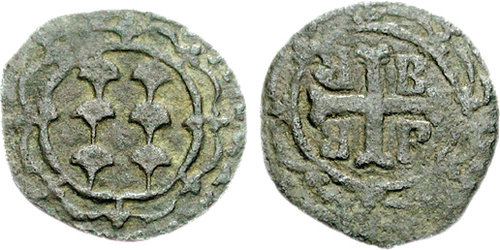
Coin of Francesco II Gattilusio, the father of John VII's wife Irene Gattilusio

John VII never gave up his claim to be emperor, and continued to be a powerful political player in the Byzantine Empire for years following his deposition. Sometime before 1397, possibly as early as 1390, John married Irene Gattilusio, daughter of Francesco II Gattilusio, the lord of the island of Lesbos. After John V returned to the throne, Bayezid summoned both junior co-emperors, Manuel and John VII, to join the sultan's campaigns in Anatolia. They were both forced to take part in the Ottoman subjection of Philadelphia, the last Christian city in western Anatolia. When John V died in 1391, Manuel, at Bayezid's court at the time, quickly made his way to Constantinople to pre-empt John VII claiming the throne.

John VII continued to govern Selymbria following John V's death and continued to aspire to become senior emperor following Manuel II's rise to the throne. He ruled Selymbria as a vassal of Bayezid I, which meant that he was forced to aid the sultan in further campaigns in Anatolia. According to historian John W. Barker, John VII attempted to sell his claim to the Byzantine throne to Charles VI of France. In 1397 in Selymbria, John VII supposedly entrusted the French nobles Henry of Bar and John of Nevers with negotiating with Charles VI, with John VII seeking a French castle and a generous pension in return for giving up the title. Barker's hypothesis is based on a real legal document signed on 15 July 1397, possibly at Saray rather than Selymbria, but the document itself contains no mentions of what rights John VII entrusted the French nobles with or what his exact intentions in negotiating with Charles VI were. The idea that John VII intended to sell his claims is based on premature interpretations of the document itself and notes by the nobles concerning a discussion with Francesco II Gattilusio on Lesbos, during which Gattilusio supposedly divulged what he believed John's intentions to be.

John VII's hopes of claiming the throne continued to be supported by Bayezid I, who saw him as a more promising candidate than the staunchly anti-Ottoman Manuel II. By supporting John VII, Bayezid hoped to turn the Byzantine Empire into an obedient vassal state, as it had nearly been under John V's rule. Though Bayezid was a significant ally, his overt support for John was used by Manuel II in his efforts to delegitimise John's claims. In some of Manuel II's early texts, he went as far as to claim that John's ultimate plan was to surrender Constantinople to the Ottomans.

Despite Manuel's propaganda campaign, John still enjoyed considerable support, both within the empire and among its allies. In addition to Bayezid, John continued to be supported by the Republic of Genoa, with which he had commercial connections. In addition, John was also backed by a wide network of rich Byzantine aristocrats. His wide support and wealth gave him a constant pool of resources that he could use in the feud with his uncle.

In addition to his backing by certain aristocrats and his international allies, there was also a faction within Constantinople, mainly composed of commoners, who wished to restore John VII as senior emperor, as late as 1399. This faction opposed Manuel II's rule, believing that he did not care about the empire's survival, and that he ruled as a tyrant. As John VII had been constitutionally invested with the right to succeed to the throne in 1381, they saw him as the legitimate heir, not Manuel, who was viewed as a usurper more interested in his own power than anything else. This perception of Manuel was used by John VII in his own propaganda.

=== Reconciliation with Manuel II and tenure as regent ===
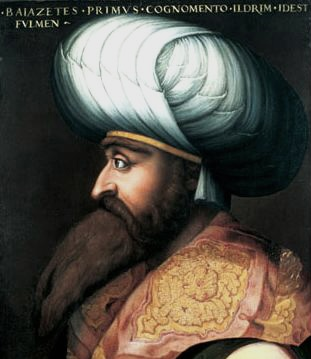
Portrait of Sultan Bayezid I by Cristofano dell'Altissimo (1552–1562)

Tensions between John VII and Manuel escalated as Bayezid began to threaten to conquer Constantinople. In 1394, Bayezid laid siege to the city. Encouraged by the French knight Boucicaut, who had been placed as the leader of Constantinople's defense and who had good relations with both John VII and Manuel, the two emperors reached an agreement meant to end their dynastic feud in 1399. According to the Byzantine monk Symeon of Thessalonica, John VII's attitude towards Manuel had only changed because Bayezid had attacked his lands around Selymbria in 1397. The agreement was that Manuel adopted John VII, and that John VII in turn adopted Manuel's sons and daughters, uniting the two branches of the family. Manuel also formally acknowledged John VII as the first co-emperor, outranking Manuel's own son, John VIII Palaiologos, who then became the second co-emperor.

The agreement allowed Manuel to leave the city in a three-year long mission to travel around Europe in an attempt to secure military aid, while John was entrusted to remain in Constantinople as regent, governing the city in Manuel's absence. Though in effect having become Emperor-regent, John's responsibility was mainly the defense of Constantinople, not other matters normally handled by the emperor. Due to a lack of sources, John VII's regency in Constantinople is not well documented, and the extent of his power and how he exercised it is not entirely clear. It does not appear that the 1399 agreement was honoured by Manuel, as he sent his family (now ostensibly John's family) to his brother Theodore Palaiologos in the Morea. The only textual records that survive of John's activities in Constantinople are treaties with the Venetians and Genose, and documentation of his decision to depose Patriarch Matthew I. Matthew I had many enemies in Constantinople, for reasons not entirely clear, and the anti-Matthew faction managed to persuade John VII to depose him. He would later be restored by Manuel once he returned to Constantinople. In the Byzantine Empire, ultimate authority to appoint patriarchs rested with the emperor alone.

While besieging the city, Bayezid attempted to appeal to John VII's supporters by posing as a defender of John VII's legitimacy and offering peace on the condition that John was restored to the throne, terms that had been refused by Manuel before he left, a decision which prolonged the siege. Once Manuel had left the city, Bayezid tried to negotiate directly with John VII. Perhaps overlooking that he had supported Manuel's deposition of John VII in 1390, his own attack on John VII's lands in Selymbria in 1397, and the reconciliation between the two emperors, Bayezid seemed to still believe that he could rely on John VII to do his bidding. Shortly after Manuel's departure from Constantinople, he sent the following message to John VII from Adrianople:

If I have indeed put the Basileus Manuel out of the city, not for your sake have I done this, but for mine. And if, then, you wish to be our friend, withdraw from thence and I will give you a province, whatever one you may wish. But if you do not, with God and his great Prophet as my witness, I will spare no one, but all will I utterly destroy.

John VII refused to surrender the city and replied defiantly to Bayezid's messenger, recorded as having said the following:

Withdraw, report to your lord: we are in poverty and there is no great power whereunto we may flee, except to God who aids the powerless and Who overpowers the powerful. So if you wish anything, do it!

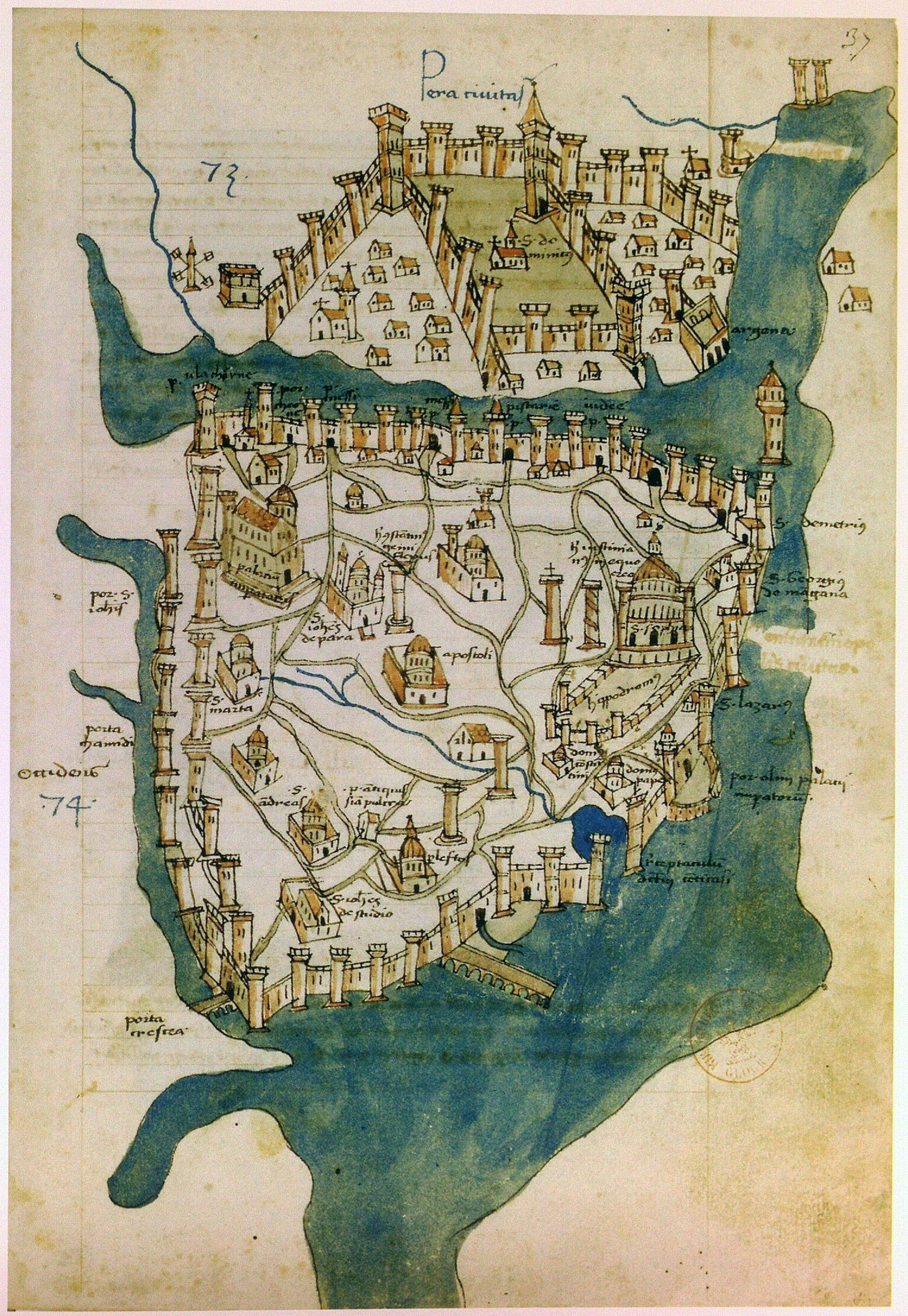
1422 map of Constantinople by cartographer Cristoforo Buondelmonti, the oldest surviving map of the city

The situation grew more grim as time went on and Manuel's absence dragged on. Though Venice had promised to send military aid to lift the siege, the promised forces never arrived. Despite his forces being exhausted and the Timurids appearing in the eastern parts of his empire, Bayezid refused to abandon the siege. Throughout the six-year-long siege, the citizens of Constantinople suffered. Many of them chose to escape from the walls to personally surrender to the Ottoman forces.

Despite having refused to surrender the city, John VII maintained some connections to Bayezid. Early in January 1401, John VII was away from Constantinople, attempting to sign an agreement with Bayezid. Whatever he did, it appears to have worked momentarily as the siege was lifted for a brief period in the summer. In 1402, John VII is recorded as present on an Ottoman military expedition in the Peloponnese. On 1 June 1402, as the siege was escalating, John VII sent a letter to Henry IV of England, writing of the urgent danger threatening Constantinople. About a month after this letter was sent, Bayezid finally left the city, having to deal with the Timurids. Bayezid's defeat and capture at the Battle of Ankara on 20 July 1402, and the subsequent period of Ottoman civil war it sparked, ended the siege of Constantinople and saved the city.

The Ottoman defeat at Ankara was used by John to negotiate a treaty with one of Bayezid I's sons, Süleyman Çelebi, in which the city of Thessalonica, as well as substantial territories in Thrace and Macedonia, were returned to the Byzantine Empire. John baptised and christianised two of Bayezid's sons in 1403: İsa Çelebi and Yusuf Çelebi. İsa may have been adopted by John, and Yusuf is recorded to have continued to live in Constantinople, attested there as late as 1413.

Upon Manuel's return to Constantinople in June 1403, John returned power to him. Though some contemporary comments seem to suggest that everyone expected John VII to refuse to surrender power, John VII appears to have been content with letting go of his responsibilities after governing the Byzantine capital for three and a half years. Once Manuel returned, he reversed several of John VII's decisions, for instance disavowing a treaty John VII had arranged with the Ottomans, in which he had granted them religious and financial privileges.

=== Further tensions within the imperial family ===
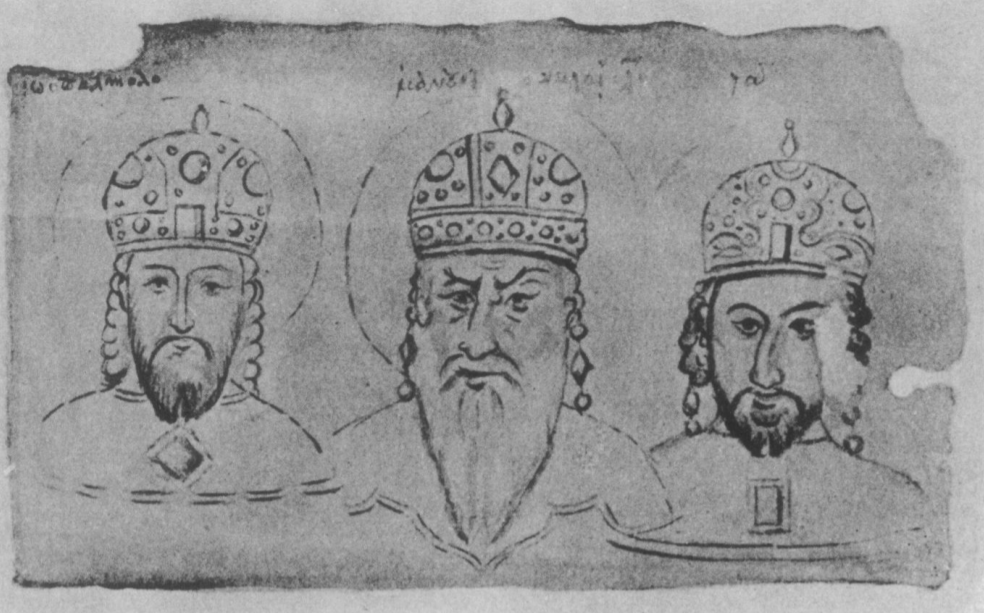
15th-century portraits of John VII, Manuel II and John VIII (from a 15th-century codex in the Bibliothèque Nationale of Paris)

After Manuel's return in 1403, relations between him and John VII were tense once more. Since he knew that John VII could no longer rely on the support of the Ottomans, Manuel attempted to completely exclude him from the imperial hierarchy, stripping him of the title basileus and depriving him of his promised lands in Selymbria and Thessalonica. The reasons for excluding John was attributed by Manuel to rumours that John had initiated negotiations in 1402 with Bayezid concerning the surrender of Constantinople. The contemporary Castilian traveller Ruy González de Clavijo wrote that John and Bayezid had agreed that should Bayezid defeat the Timurids, John would surrender the city. It is doubtful that such an agreement was ever made, especially since John proved himself to be loyal for the duration of his tenure as regent and concluded a highly favourable treaty with the Ottoman prince Süleyman Çelebi. According to German historian Peter Wirth, it is possible that the reason for resentment again brewing up between John and Manuel after Manuel's return could be that Manuel felt that he had been ignored and left out of these important negotiations.

John was sent to the island of Lemnos, apparently in disgrace, but fled to his father-in-law Francesco on nearby Lesbos. Soon thereafter, in September 1403, John and Francesco launched a naval expedition against Thessalonica, though it appears to have had little to no result. The expedition was not some attempt to seize the city from Manuel's control, but rather to liberate it from the Ottomans, as an Ottoman garrison was still present. John VII and Francesco returned to Lesbos, where Boucicaut was also residing at the time. Together with Boucicaut, they then travelled to Constantinople at the head of an army, planning to take the city from Manuel by force.

Though they ultimately chose not to attack the city, John VII's drastic actions called for a new political agreement between the dynasts. The resulting 1403 agreement between John VII and Manuel was similar to the one they had made in 1399. As Manuel's adoptive son, John VII remained the first co-emperor and Manuel's actual son, John VIII, continued being the second co-emperor. John VII's rights to Thessalonica were also affirmed. Clavijo, present in Constantinople at the time, writes that both Manuel and John VII were designated as full emperors and that John VII was to reign alone after Manuel's death, after which he was to be succeeded by Manuel's son John VIII, who in turn would be succeeded by John VII's newly born son, Andronikos V Palaiologos. Contemporary reactions to the resolution appear to have been bitter. Clavijo wrote that he did not believe that the agreement would be respected by either emperor.

=== Emperor in Thessalonica ===
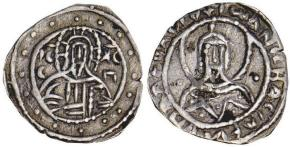
Half-stavraton coin of John VII. The coin features a bust of the emperor (right) and Christ Pantocrator (left).

The transfer of Thessalonica from Ottoman control to the Byzantines was overseen by Manuel's confidant, Demetrios Laskaris Leontares, who per the agreement between the two emperors handed it over to John VII. According to preserved documents signed by John VII, he probably first arrived in Thessalonica in late 1403. Though John was accompanied on the initial journey by some of Manuel's staunchest supporters, such as Leontares and Demetrios Chrysoloras, who were ordered to keep an eye on his activities, John VII immediately assumed autonomy from Constantinople. Despite their agreement and John VII's de facto autonomy, Manuel's texts state that John was "given" Thessalonica by Manuel, a phrasing which suggests that Manuel still considered himself to be John VII's superior. Though no known surviving copies exist, a detailed oath was drawn up between Manuel and John, which decided upon a well-defined border between the empires of Constantinople and Thessalonica. Some territories located nearer to Thessalonica than to Constantinople, such as Mount Athos, were kept as sworn to Constantinople.

John was invested as Despot of Thessalonica and was allowed to keep the full imperial title. While ruling Thessalonica, John VII is attested as having used the title Βασιλεύς ἀπάσης Θετταλίας, variously translated as "Emperor of Thessaly", "Emperor of All Thessaly", "Emperor of all the Thessaly" or "Emperor of all of Thessaly". Though he had assumed this new title, John VII never stopped asserting his right to be the legitimate Byzantine emperor, continuing to use the titles autokrator and basileus, identical to the titulature of Manuel. In foreign correspondence, he was addressed in the same way as his uncle. Preserved treaties with the Italian republics refer to John VII as imperador di Griesi ("Emperor of the Greeks") and lo gran imperator Caloiani imperador di Griesi ("The great emperor Kalojoannes, (Note: Kalojoannes (Greek: Kαλοϊωάννης, romanized: Kaloïōannēs, lit. 'John the Good / John the Beautiful') was a nickname applied to several emperors named John. The nickname is simply a more ornate and flattering version of Ioannes.) Emperor of the Greeks"). John's entry into Thessalonica was commemorated in a Byzantine ivory pyxis (a cylindrical box with a lid). This pyxis, today held at Dumbarton Oaks, depicts both the imperial family of John VII (including his wife Irene and his son Andronikos V) and the imperial family of Manuel II (including his wife Helena Dragaš and his son, John VIII).

At Thessalonica, John VII created his own treasury and issued his own coins with his own portrait rather than that of Manuel. He created his own imperial court and chancery, where documents were signed with his name rather than the name of Manuel. Throughout John's reign in Thessalonica, which lasted until his death in 1408, the Byzantine Empire thus experienced a period of dual rule, essentially divided into two. John's activities as emperor in Thessalonica consisted mainly of organising the city's defense and regulating local church property. He appears to have been content with his position; there are no further records of conflict between John VII and Manuel after the events of 1403.

John VII's arrival in Thessalonica meant more to the Thessalonians than simply the arrival of an emperor. Through his 1403 treaty, John VII had liberated the city from the Ottomans and once more made it into the second city of the Byzantine Empire. Though Manuel had also been involved in some of the negotiations, the majority of the credit for ensuring Thessalonica's return to imperial control has to be given to John VII. As such, his arrival in the city was not just the arrival of a new governor, but of the city's liberator. Throughout his reign in Thessalonica, the Thessalonians continued to view John VII as an able ruler. According to Symeon of Thessalonica, John VII "fortified [the city] on all sides with triremes and outer walls" and "adorned [it] with good regulations and institutions".

Shortly after arriving in Thessalonica, John VII had raised his son, Andronikos V, to co-emperor. John VII viewed Andonikos V as not just his own legitimate successor, but the future legitimate successor to the Byzantine Empire. This can be gathered from the aforementioned pyxis depicting Andronikos V more prominently than Manuel's heir, John VIII, as well as monodies composed after Andronikos V's death. One such monody states that Andronikos's parents had "regarded him gladly as their successor". Andronikos V, who was named after his grandfather Andronikos IV, was per the 1403 agreement the legitimate heir to the empire, set to be the heir to Manuel's son John VIII. Any plans for Andronikos V's future fell through when he died in 1407 at the age of seven. Some time after Andronikos V's death, John became a monk, assuming the monastic name Joseph. John VII died in Thessalonica a year after Andronikos V, on 22 September 1408, at the relatively young age of 38. With the deaths of Andronikos V and John VII, the rival imperial lineage that had been established by Andronikos IV died out. (Note: According to British historian Steven Runciman, John VII and Irene Gattilusio might also have had a daughter, who married Loukas Notaras.)

== Legacy ==
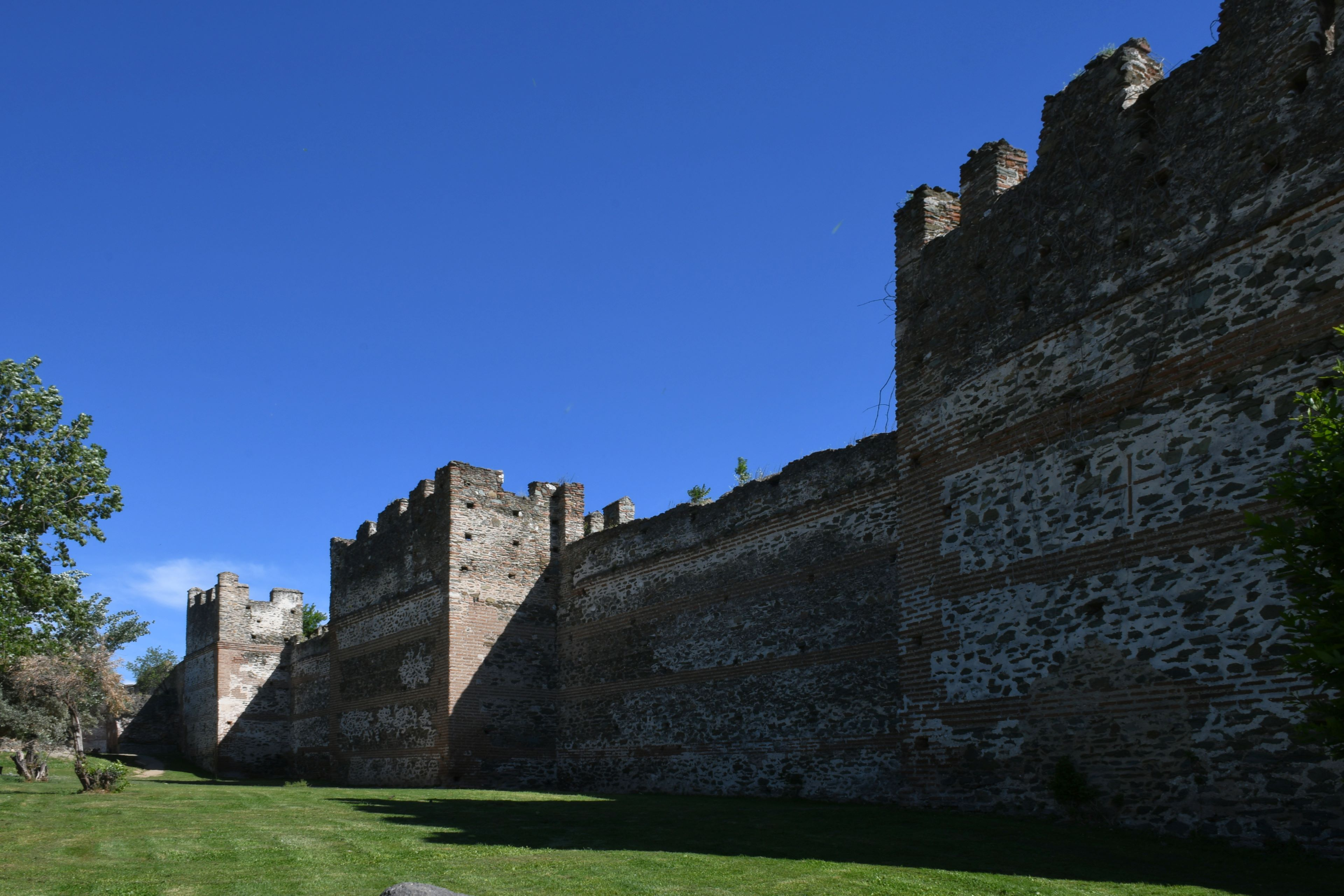
The medieval walls of Thessalonica were worked on extensively during John VII's reign in the city.

John VII was positively remembered in Thessalonica. The city was often not wholly obedient to Constantinople, with its leaders often going their own way in terms of administration. To the citizens of Thessalonica, John's death was a significant blow to their autonomy. John VII's reign in Thessalonica was the last time the city served as a counter-capital of sorts to Constantinople. Manuel visited the city in 1409 and installed his young son, Andronikos, as governor. While he was met with many approving citizens, there were also many who opposed a ruler from Constantinople being imposed upon them. That the Thessalonians had enjoyed the rule of a leader with a rebellious past, who just like Manuel bore the title basileus, had probably only stimulated the city's separatist tendencies.

A praiseful passage in a eulogy of John, from the Synodikon of Thessalonica, reads:

For our emperor John Palaiologos fought almost on his knees fiercely and courageously in defense of the Romans at a time when foreign peoples were leaning towards us [...] and when an unspeakably most powerful billow which had been raised and was threatening to destroy everything, and released the emperor from slavery and secured our safety by all possible means.

Another eulogy, this one probably written by Symeon of Thessalonica, contains this passage:

He conducted himself in a truly orthodox manner through his entire life. He was an outstanding defender of the church and its sacred doctrines .... When waves of unheard-of violence rose up and threatened to engulf everything, he did not yield, but like a good pilot he again took control for the Romans. He recovered several cities from the hands of the barbarians, of which the first and greatest was our own Thessalonike, seeing the light of freedom after long servitude. He established his residence in our city and, neglecting nothing that was needed, he employed all means to assure our safety. He also gained many victories and triumphs over his own sufferings; the great variety of illnesses which he bore caused him to progress in virtue.

Other eulogies, as well as a similarly praiseful monody by the contemporary Byzantine author Theodore Potamios, almost give the impression that a cult of John VII was beginning to develop in Thessalonica.

== Notes ==
John VII Palaiologos Palaiologos dynasty Born: 1370 Died: 22 September 1408
Regnal titles
Preceded by John V Palaiologos	Byzantine emperor 1390	Succeeded by John V Palaiologos
Vacant Thessalonica under Ottoman control Title last held by Manuel II Palaiologos (1387)	Byzantine emperor in Thessalonica; 1403–1408 with Andronikos V Palaiologos (1403–1407)	Succeeded by Andronikos Palaiologos as despot
