= Potap (given name) =

Potap is a Slavic masculine given name. It originated from Greek Πατάπιος, Patapios. Archaic / Old Church Slavonic variants: Потапий, Патапий, Potapiy/Potapy, Patapiy. It produced patronymic surnames Potapenko, Potapchik/Potapczyk, Potapchuk/Potapczuk, Potapkin/Potapkins, Potapovich/Potapowicz, Potapov, Potapsky/Potapski. The East Slavic patronymic derived from the name, Potapovich or Potapych, is used in reference to a bear in Russian folklore: Пoтaпыч, Михайло Потапыч, Михайло Потапыч Топтыгин, Potapych, Mikhaylo Potapych, Mikhaylo Potapych Toptygin, etc., because to say the real name of the animal was a taboo.

Notable people with the name include:

- Potap, stage name of a Ukrainian singer, rapper, songwriter, and producer Oleksiy Potapenko
- Potapy Emelianov (1889–1936), Russian clergyman and Eastern Catholic martyr
- Potap Kuzmich Zaikov (fl. 1770s–1790s), Russian explorer
