= Potapkin =

Potapkin, feminine: Potapkina is a Russian patronymic surname derived from the diminutive Potapko/Potapka of the given name Potap. Latvianizad variant: Potapkins. Notable people with the surname include:

- Albert Potapkin, Russian musician, former drummer in Nochnye Snaipery
- Andrey Potapkin, Russian rower
- Anna Potapkina, better known as Anna Jane (1988–2023), Russian writer
