= Andronikos V Palaiologos =

Byzantine co-emperor from 1403 to 1407

- Emperor and Autocrat of the Romans
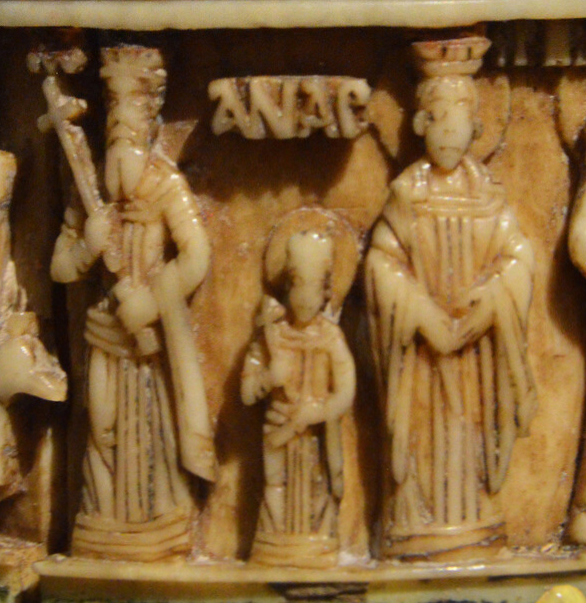
- Andronikos V (center) and his parents, as depicted in an ivory pyxis from Thessalonica. The letters ANΔP are written above his head, standing for Ανδρ(όνικος)

Byzantine co-emperor in Thessalonica
- Reign: c. 1403–1407
- Born: c. 1400; Constantinople (now Istanbul, Turkey)
- Died: c. 1407 (aged 7); Thessalonica (now Thessaloniki, Greece)
- Dynasty: Palaiologos
- Father: John VII Palaiologos
- Mother: Irene Gattilusio

Andronikos V Palaiologos or Andronicus V Palaeologus (Greek: Ανδρόνικος Παλαιολόγος, romanized: Andrónikos Palaiológos; c. 1400–1407) was the Byzantine ruler of the city of Thessalonica and surrounding territories from 1403 to his death in 1407, alongside his father John VII Palaiologos. Though they did not control Constantinople, John and Andronikos ruled Thessalonica with the full Byzantine imperial title, recognized by the ruling senior emperor, John VII's uncle Manuel II Palaiologos.

Recognized as third-in-line to Constantinople, Andronikos' parents had high hopes for his future and regarded him as the future legitimate senior Byzantine emperor. These hopes were dashed when Andronikos died in 1407, just seven years old. On account of his ephemeral status and short life, Andronikos is a shadowy historical figure of whom little is known. He was not acknowledged by modern historians until 1967, who had previously believed John VII to be childless.

== Life ==
Andronikos V Palaiologos was born c. 1400. (Note: Andronikos cannot have been born earlier than December 1399, when John VII was made regent in Constantinople upon Manuel II's journey to Western Europe. John VII is mentioned as being accompanied to Constantinople by his mother and his wife, with no mention of a child. It is also unlikely that Manuel would have entrusted the notoriously ambitious John to act as regent if John had already fathered an heir. Given that Andronikos died at the age of seven, before his father, and John VII died in 1408, Andronikos cannot have been born later than 1401.) The only son of John VII Palaiologos (r. 1390, 1403–1408) and his wife Irene Gattilusio, Andronikos was named after his paternal grandfather, Andronikos IV Palaiologos (r. 1376–1379). John VII had briefly ruled the Byzantine Empire in 1390, after usurping the throne from his grandfather, John V Palaiologos (r. 1341–1391). Although John VII had been deposed after just five months on the throne, he never gave up his claim to be the legitimate senior emperor, even after the accession of John V's successor, Manuel II Palaiologos (r. 1391–1425), John VII's uncle, in 1391. After a long feud between the two, and risking civil war, Manuel and John VII reached an agreement in 1403, in which John VII, still officially a junior emperor, would reign alone after Manuel's death. Per the agreement, John VII would then be succeeded by Manuel's son, John VIII Palaiologos (r. 1425–1448), who in turn would be succeeded by John VII's son, Andronikos V. Additionally, John VII was granted the city of Thessalonica, whom he had recently been responsible for returning to Byzantine control, and was also allowed to keep the title of emperor. Shortly after arriving in Thessalonica in 1403, John VII established his own imperial court there and crowned Andronikos V as co-emperor.

The emperors in Thessalonica continued to use the full imperial title, which they were entitled to per the agreement with Manuel, employing both the styles basileus (emperor) and autokrator (autocrat). John VII regarded Andronikos V not just as his own successor, but also the future legitimate senior Byzantine emperor. John VII's entry into Thessalonica was commemorated in a Byzantine ivory pyxis (a cylindrical box with a lid), today housed at Dumbarton Oaks, which depicts the families of both John VII and Manuel. The pyxis notably depicts Andronikos V more prominently than Manuel's son John VIII, despite John VIII being both older and higher in the line of succession.

The plans and hopes for Andronikos V's future fell through when he died c. 1407, at the age of seven. (Note: Given that Andronikos predeceased his father, he must have died before 22 September 1408. The surviving source material specifies that he died at the age of seven.) Monodies (lamentations for a death) were composed for Andronikos and John VII succumbed to intense grief. The Metropolitan of Thessalonica, Gabriel I, wrote a consolatory letter to John VII. In his letter, Gabriel wrote that he too grieved, since he had prayed that the young emperor would grow to adulthood and succeed his father and also stated that he regretted not being present in Thessalonica at the time to offer consolation and sympathy in person. John VII died not long after Andronikos, on 22 September 1408, ending the Byzantine diarchy established in 1403 and John VII's rival imperial lineage.

== Historiography ==
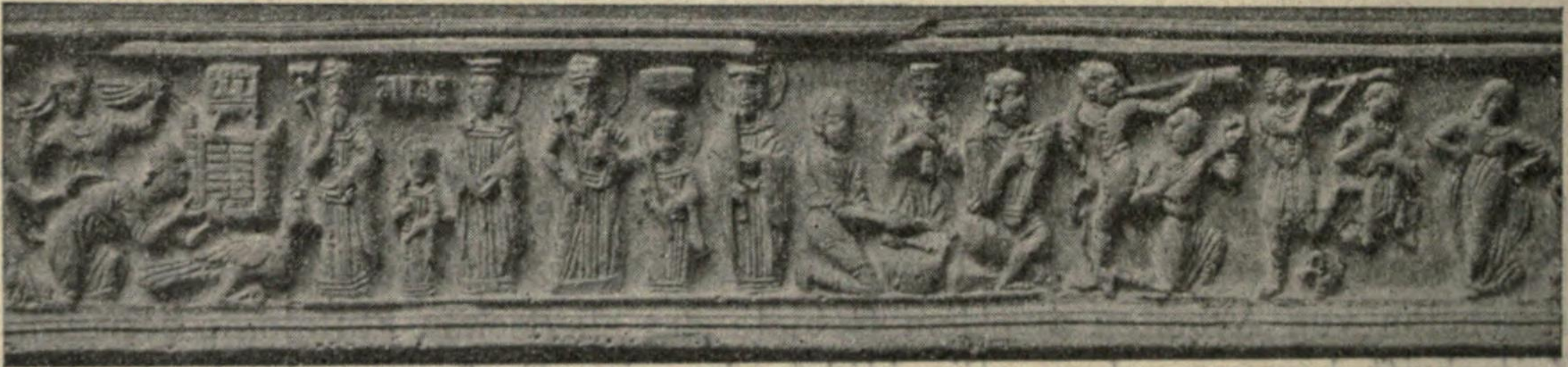
The full artwork of the ivory pyxis which includes a depiction of Andronikos V

As a short-lived child emperor, Andronikos is a shadowy and ephemeral figure of whom little source material survives. He was only recently acknowledged by Byzantinists. Andronikos was first identified by George T. Dennis in 1967, with John VII previously believed to have been childless. Dennis based his argument for Andronikos' existence mainly on two previously unpublished manuscripts, one containing a monody and the other containing a consolatory letter to an emperor from a bishop. The monody is titled "Monody on the death of the Lord Emperor Andronikos Palaiologos, the son of Lord John the nephew of Lord Emperor Manuel, at the age of seven years", (Note: The full monody reads "Never has anything more sorrowful and difficult to bear occurred than at present, for nobody can refrain from grieving at the death of this beautiful imperial child, the young Andronikos. What can anyone say in the face of such a grievous loss? The imperial couple, your parents, placed their hopes in you, their only joy, and confidently regarded you gladly as their successor. But now you have brought unbearable sorrow to them and to all of us. What consolation can we find in our distress? Scarcely did we behold this imperial child, when suddenly he departed from our midst. With the prophet Jeremiah we lament, not for Jerusalem, but for this wonderful imperial child, Andronikos Palaiologos. While weeping various thoughts came to me. Does my beautiful emperor, so young, still play somewhere on Earth? No, for he is covered by a small tomb. Yet, despite our grief, there is cause to be glad, for although the emperor's body is in the grave, his soul is with Christ in Paradise. This realization changed my sorrow to joy and I gave thanks to God. Most noble of emperors, now that you have free access to God, do not forget to intercede for us so that we may be delivered from all difficulties and in peace may sing hymns to the Holy Trinity forever".) expliclity identifying the name, father, and age of the child, as well as confirming that he was emperor. The consolatory letter was identified as written by Gabriel of Thessalonica, which means that the timeframe only fits if he wrote to John VII concerning Andronikos' death. Dennis also used the 1403 succession agreement between John VII and Manuel as evidence. The surviving documents only state that John VII would become senior emperor after Manuel, and then be followed by "Manuel's son", who would be followed by "the son of John". Though this could be interpreted as a future supposed child of John, Dennis interpreted it as evidence that John already had a son (Andronikos) by this point.

The sole surviving depiction of the emperor, the ivory pyxis from Thessalonica, was first studied in 1899, though the researcher, Josef Strzygowski, was uncertain as to what imperial family was depicted given that the father John, mother Irene and son Andronikos did not appear to match any known family. In 1960, André Grabar proposed that the artwork depicted John VI Kantakouzenos, his wife Irene and their grandson Andronikos IV Palaiologos, an explanation also accepted by Kurt Weitzmann in 1972. This identification presents problems due to difficulties in then identifying the second imperial family depicted (Manuel II, his wife Helena and their son John VIII) and their connection to the first family. The identification of the first family as that of John VII was first proposed by Nicolas Oikonomides in 1977.

Whether Andronikos is most appropriately considered a despot of Thessalonica, a purely nominal or titular co-emperor, or a full emperor varies between sources. It is general practice among Byzantinists to only view actually reigning senior rulers as emperors, eliminating junior co-rulers who, though they had the same titles, often only had nominal power. There are some exceptions, notably the earlier Michael IX Palaiologos (r. 1294–1320), whose rule was fully encompassed by that of his father, Andronikos II Palaiologos (r. 1282–1328). Regardless of the status ascribed to Andronikos V, his enumeration as emperor is unproblematic given that no further emperors named Andronikos reigned after him. The numeral was first assigned to Andronikos by George T. Dennis in 1967.

== Notes ==
Andronikos V Palaiologos Palaiologos dynasty Born: Unknown 1400 Died: Unknown 1407
Regnal titles
Vacant Title last held by Manuel II Palaiologos (1387)	Byzantine emperor in Thessalonica; 1403–1407 with John VII Palaiologos	Succeeded by John VII Palaiologos
