= Potapenko =

Potapenko (Ukrainian: Потапенко) is a Ukrainian patronymic surname derived from the given name Potap. Notable people with the surname include:

- Gennady Potapenko (1894–1979), American radio astronomer
- Ignaty Potapenko (1856–1929), Russian writer and playwright
- Oleksiy Potapenko, or Potap (born 1981), Ukrainian singer, composer and producer
- Sergei Potapenko (born 1963), Belarusian Military leader, Deputy Minister of Defense
- Vasyl' Potapenko (1886–1934), Ukrainian guide-boy for kobzar Tereshko Parkhomenko and bandurist
- Vitaly Potapenko (born 1975), Ukrainian basketball player who played in the National Basketball Association
