= Thessalonica (theme) =

Province of the Byzantine Empire

Theme of Thessalonica Θεσσαλονίκη, θέμα Θεσσαλονίκης
- Theme of the Byzantine Empire
- 800s–1204 1242–1392; 1403–1423
- Map of Byzantine Greece ca. 900 AD, with the themes and major settlements
- Capital: Thessalonica
- Historical era: Middle Ages
  - Established: 809
  - Fourth Crusade: 1204
  - Recovery by Nicaean Empire: 1242
  - Captured by Ottomans: 1392
- Today part of: Greece

The Theme of Thessalonica (Greek: Θέμα Θεσσαλονίκης) was a military-civilian province (thema or theme) of the Byzantine Empire located in the southern Balkans, comprising varying parts of Central and Western Macedonia and centred on Thessalonica, the Empire's second-most important city.

== History ==
In Late Antiquity, Thessalonica was the capital of the Roman province of Macedonia and of the Diocese of Macedonia, and the seat of the praetorian prefect of Illyricum. With the loss of most of the Balkan hinterland to the Slavic and Bulgar invasions in the 7th century, however, the authority of the prefect (in Greek eparchos, "eparch") was largely confined to the city and its immediate surroundings. The eparch continued to govern Thessalonica until the early 9th century, when he was replaced by a strategos at the head of the new theme of Thessalonica.

The strategos of Thessalonica is attested for the first time in 836, but a letter of Emperor Michael II (r. 820–829) to the Frankish king Louis the Pious (r. 814–840) may indicate the theme's existence already in 824. The historian Warren Treadgold dates the theme's creation to c. 809, during the anti-Bulgarian campaigns of Emperor Nikephoros I (r. 802–811) which extended Byzantine rule to the city's hinterland. Treadgold further conjectures that its troops in the 9th century numbered about 2,000 men. To the east, the theme extended to the river Strymon and the theme of the same name. To the south, it bounded the theme of Hellas, somewhere in northern Thessaly. Its western and northern bounds were undetermined, fluctuating with the tide of war between the Byzantines, the local Slavic tribes, and the Bulgarians.

Under Emperor John I Tzimiskes (r. 969–976), a doux who commanded the professional tagmatic troops stationed in the theme was installed in the city, and seems to have co-existed for a while with the strategos, before assuming the latter's duties as well. In the 11th century, the doukaton of Thessalonica was of such importance that it was often held by members of the imperial family. The city and most of Macedonia were captured by Latins after the Fourth Crusade, and became part of the Kingdom of Thessalonica, which survived until 1224, when it was captured by Despotate of Epirus, giving rise to the short-lived Empire of Thessalonica. The theme was reconstituted after the city and most of Macedonia fell into the hands of the Empire of Nicaea in 1246, and survived until captured by the Ottoman Turks in 1392; by that time, however, the theme was essentially reduced to the city itself. Regained by Byzantium in 1402, the city became the seat of a despotate, until it was surrendered to Venice in 1423, during another siege by the Ottomans which ended with the city's conquest in 1430.

== Autonomous rulers ==
The list of the autonomous rulers of Thessalonica in the Byzantine Empire under the Palaiologos dynasty:

- Irene of Montferrat (1303–1317), as empress
- Anna of Savoy (1351–1365), as empress
- Manuel II Palaiologos (1382–1387), as emperor
- John VII Palaiologos (1403–1408), as emperor
  - Andronikos V Palaiologos (1403–1407), as co-emperor
- Andronikos Palaiologos (1408–1423), as despot

== Sources ==
- Chatziantoniou, Elisavet (2012–2013). "Παρατηρήσεις σχετικά με την οικονομική διοίκηση του θέματος Βολερού, Στρυμόνος και Θεσσαλονίκης (11ος αι.)" [Observations regarding the Fiscal Administration of the theme of Boleros, Strymon, and Thessalonike (11th century)] (PDF). Byzantiaka (in Greek). 30. Thessaloniki: Hellenic Historical Society: 149–193. Archived from the original (PDF) on 2016-03-04.
- Kazhdan, Alexander, ed. (1991). The Oxford Dictionary of Byzantium. Oxford and New York: Oxford University Press. ISBN 0-19-504652-8.
- Nesbitt, John; Oikonomides, Nicolas, eds. (1991). Catalogue of Byzantine Seals at Dumbarton Oaks and in the Fogg Museum of Art, Volume 1: Italy, North of the Balkans, North of the Black Sea. Vol. 1. Washington, DC: Dumbarton Oaks Research Library and Collection. ISBN 0-88402-194-7.
- Oikonomides, Nicolas (1972). Les listes de préséance byzantines des IXe et Xe siècles (in French). Paris: Editions du Centre National de la Recherche Scientifique.
- Pertusi, A. (1952). Constantino Porfirogenito: De Thematibus (in Italian). Rome: Biblioteca Apostolica Vaticana.
- Treadgold, Warren T. (1995). Byzantium and Its Army, 284–1081. Stanford, California: Stanford University Press. ISBN 0-8047-3163-2.
