= Irene Gattilusio =

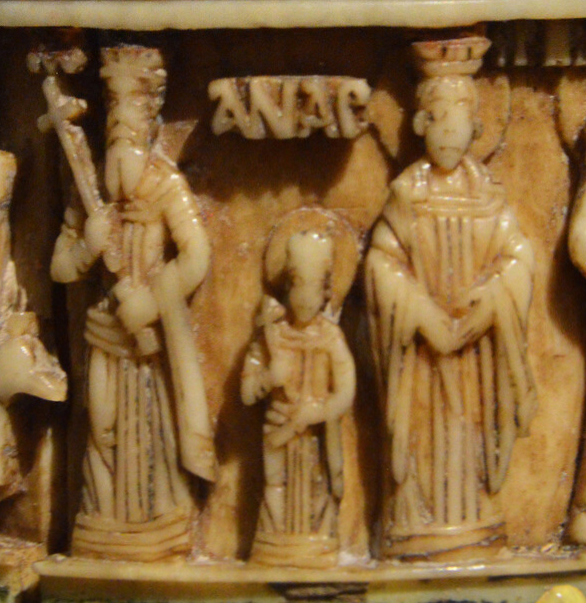
- Ivory pyxis (vessel) of Andronikos V with his parents John VII and Irene Gattilusio

Byzantine Empress consort
- Tenure: 1397–1408
- Died: 1 January 1440; Lemnos
- Burial: Church of Pantokrator
- Spouse: John VII Palaiologos
- Issue: Andronikos V Palaiologos
- House: Gattilusio
- Father: Francesco II Gattilusio
- Mother: ... Palaiologina

Irene Gattilusio (died 1 January 1440 under the monastic name Eugenia) was a Byzantine empress consort by marriage to John VII Palaiologos, a Byzantine Emperor in 1390. She was a daughter of Francesco II of Lesbos (a maternal grandson of Andronikos III Palaiologos) and Valentina Doria.

== Empress ==
At some point before August 1397, Irene married her paternal second cousin John VII Palaiologos, also a great-grandson of Andronikos III Palaiologos.

John VII had deposed his paternal grandfather, John V Palaiologos, in 1390. He ruled from 14 April to 17 September 1390 before John V was restored to the throne. John VII managed to keep the title of co-emperor and the domain of Selymbria due to intervention of Bayezid I. His grandfather died the following year, and was succeeded by Manuel II Palaiologos, a paternal uncle of John VII. The sequence of events possibly preceded the marriage of Irene to John VII. She is not mentioned involved in them.

In time relations between Manuel II and John VII would improve. From 1399 to 1402, Manuel II embarked on a journey of Western Europe, seeking allies to use against Bayezid who was besieging Constantinople. During his absence, Manuel II entrusted John VII with the regency of the city; by this time Irene was already married to John.

Bayezid lifted the siege in 1402 when Timur, founder of the Timurid dynasty, invaded Anatolia and the Ottoman Empire had to defend itself. John VII remained in control of Constantinople until the return of Manuel II, whereupon Irene's husband was expelled from the city in 1403, under suspicion of conspiring to regain the throne. Irene and John VII kept their imperial titles and established their own court at Thessaloniki.

=== Later life ===
John VII died on 22 September 1408.

Irene survived her husband and retired to Lemnos. She became a nun under the monastic name Eugenia. The chronicle of George Sphrantzes records the date of her death and her burial in the Church of Pantokrator.

== Children ==
The only known child of Irene and John VII was Andronikos V Palaiologos. He was nominal co-emperor with his father in Thessaloniki but appears to have predeceased him.

Irene Gattilusio Gattilusio Born: 14th century Died: 1440
Royal titles
Preceded by Helena Dragaš	Byzantine Empress consort 1397–1408 with Helena Dragaš (1397–1408)	Succeeded by Helena Dragaš
