= Manastır Mosque, Istanbul =

Mosque in Istanbul, Turkey

Manastır Mosque
- Manastır Mescidi
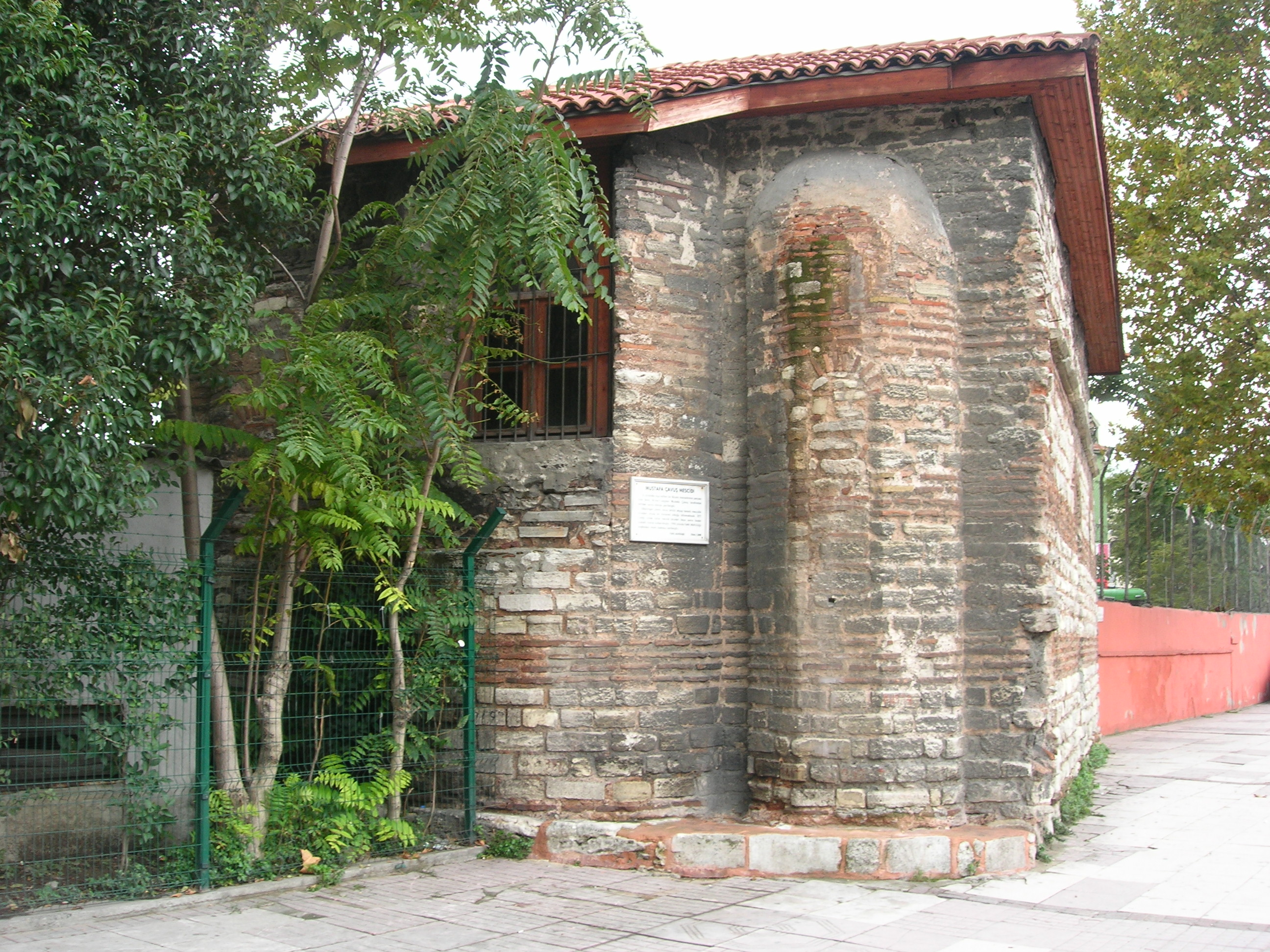
- The east side with the apses

- Location within Istanbul Fatih
- Former names: Holy Martyrs Menodora, Metrodora, and Nymphodora (?); Kyra Martha (?)

General information
- Type: Church
- Architectural style: Middle Byzantine - Comnenian
- Location: Turgut Özal Millet Caddesi 183, Istanbul, Turkey
- Coordinates: 41.01735°N 28.92838°E

Manastır Mosque (Turkish: Manastır Mescidi; also Mustafa Çavuş Mescidi, where mescit is the Turkish word for a small mosque) is a former Eastern Orthodox church converted into a mosque by the Ottomans. Neither archeological excavations nor medieval sources have made it possible to find a satisfactory answer as to its original dedication as a church. It is however possible that the small building was part of the Byzantine monastery dedicated to the Holy Martyrs Menodora, Metrodora, and Nymphodora (Greek: Μονῆ τῶν Άγίων Μηνοδώρας, Μητροδώρας καὶ Νυμφοδώρας), or an annex of the nunnery of Kyra Martha (Greek: Μονῆ τἠς Κυράς Μάρθας). The edifice is a minor example of Byzantine architecture in Constantinople, and is important for historical reasons.

== Location ==
The medieval structure lies in Istanbul, in the district of Fatih, in the neighborhood of Topkapı, on the south side of Turgut Özal Millet Caddesi, about six hundred metres (2,000 feet) south east of the Topkapı Gate of the city walls. The building can be easily reached from the center by the T1 Tram.

== History ==
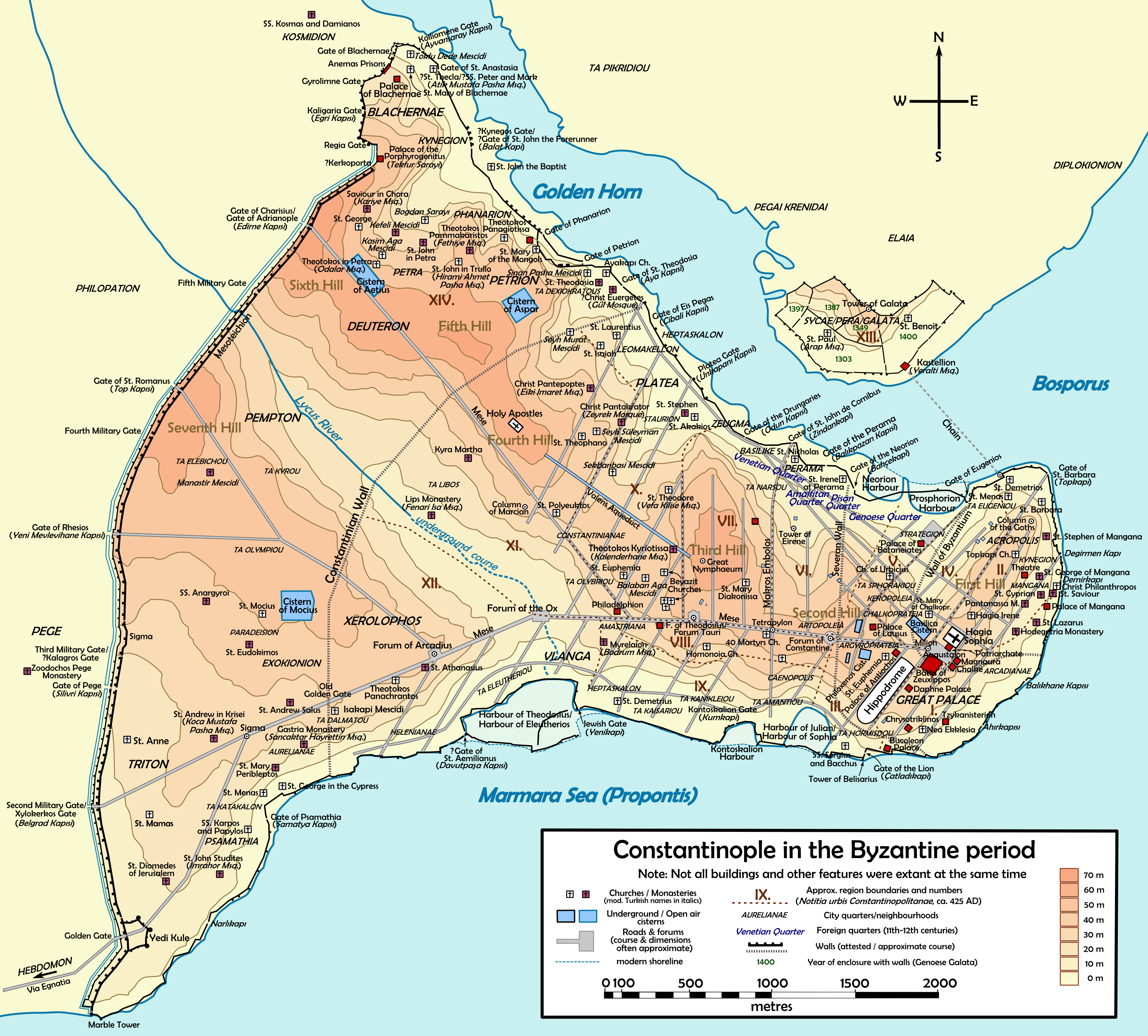
Map of Byzantine Constantinople. The Manastır Mosque is located near the central section of the land walls.

The origin of this building, which lies on the seventh hill of Constantinople, is unclear. As its Turkish name suggests, it is possible that it was a small chapel belonging to a monastery, possibly that dedicated to the Holy Martyrs Menodora, Metrodora, and Nymphodora, which existed near the Gate of St. Romanus (today Topkapı, in Turkish “Gate of the gun”), in the neighborhood of Constantinople named ta Elebichou. In the first half of the 14th century, a certain Phokas Maroulas, domestikos of the imperial table, restored the church and dedicated it to the Theotokos, founding a small monastery.

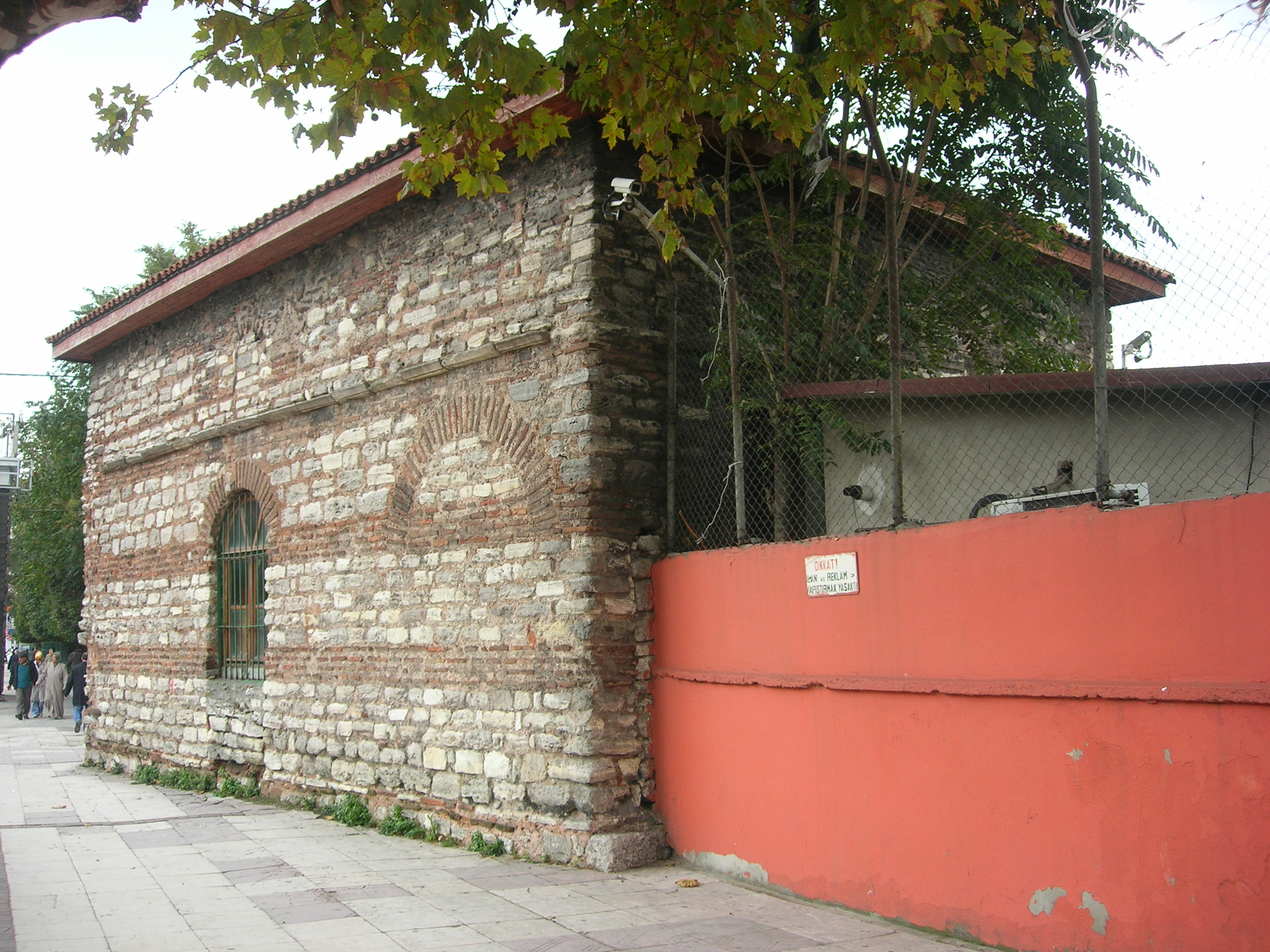
The north side with the brickwork.

According to another hypothesis, the small building could be an annex of the monastery of Kyra Martha. This was founded in 1268 by Maria, sister of Emperor Michael VIII Palaiologos. As a widow, she took the vows taking the name of Martha and founded the nunnery which bore her new name. The monastery became a personal possession of the Palaiologoi.

Shortly after the Fall of Constantinople, Mustafa, a çavuş (page) of Sultan Mehmed II, converted the building into a mescit (oratory). During the years 1956–58 the buildings cluttering around the small mosque were torn down during the opening of Turgut Özal Caddesi, and since then its usage as worship place ceased. It is now incorporated into the wall which protects one of Istanbul’s bus garages, and, due to its position, it cannot be visited without written permission from the bus company.

== Description ==
Due to its small dimensions, the building cannot be identified as a church, but rather as an oratory belonging to a monastery. The edifice has a rectangular shape, and nowadays has a single nave with three projecting apses to the east and a narthex to the west. The interior decoration has, for the most part, not survived. Only two hammered carved capitals, part of the triple arcade between the narthex and the naos, are still in place. The roof and the windows have also been modified. Excavations during the 1960s have shown that the building's original plan was more complex. The small church had three naves (possibly surmounted by a dome) and a tripartite bema. On the west side lay an exonarthex topped by a vault, while in the south side a small chapel with esonarthexes on three sides was built. Based on its masonry and plan, the building can be dated to the late eleventh century, although according to other scholars the brickwork texture could also stem from the Palaiologan age (13th–15th century).

== Sources ==
- Janin, Raymond (1953). La Géographie Ecclésiastique de l'Empire Byzantin. 1. Part: Le Siège de Constantinople et le Patriarcat Oecuménique. 3rd Vol. : Les Églises et les Monastères (in French). Paris: Institut Français d'Etudes Byzantines.
- Mamboury, Ernest (1953). The Tourists' Istanbul. Istanbul: Çituri Biraderler Basımevi.
- Eyice, Semavi (1955). Istanbul. Petite Guide a travers les Monuments Byzantins et Turcs (in French). Istanbul: Istanbul Matbaası.
- Müller-Wiener, Wolfgang (1977). Bildlexikon zur Topographie Istanbuls: Byzantion, Konstantinupolis, Istanbul bis zum Beginn d. 17 Jh (in German). Tübingen: Wasmuth. ISBN 978-3-8030-1022-3.
