= Helena Dragaš =

Byzantine empress consort

Saint Helena Dragaš
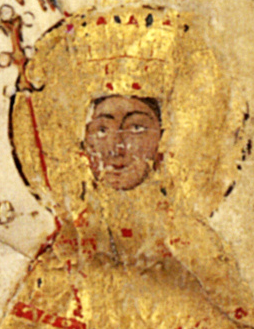
- A miniature from the Louvre. Ivoires 100 manuscript, depicting Helena

Augusta, Saint Hypomone
- Born: Helena Dragaš c. 1372
- Died: 23 March 1450; Constantinople, Byzantine Empire (now Istanbul, Turkey)
- Venerated in: Eastern Orthodox Church
- Major shrine: Monastery of Saint Patapios, Loutraki, Greece
- Feast: 29 May

Empress consort of the Byzantine Empire
- Tenure: 1392–1425 (with Irene Gattilusio, 1399–1408; Anna of Moscow, 1416–1417)
- Spouse: Manuel II Palaiologos
- Issue: John VIII, Byzantine Emperor; Theodore II, Despot of the Morea; Andronikos, Despot of Thessalonica; Constantine XI, Byzantine Emperor; Demetrios, Despot of the Morea; Thomas, Despot of the Morea
- House: Dejanović (birth); Palaiologos (marriage)
- Father: Konstantin Dejanović
- Mother: Konstantin's first wife
- Religion: Orthodox Christian

Helena Dragaš (Serbian: Јелена Драгаш, romanized: Jelena Dragaš; Greek: Ἑλένη Δραγάση, romanized: Helénē Dragásē; c. 1372 – 23 March 1450) was the Empress consort of the Byzantine Emperor Manuel II Palaiologos and the mother of the last two emperors, John VIII Palaiologos and Constantine XI Palaiologos. She served as the regent of the Byzantine Empire after the death of her son John VIII in 1448 until the enthronement of her son Constantine XI in 1449.

Born into Serbian nobility, she later became a nun and is venerated as a saint by the Eastern Orthodox Church under her monastic name, Saint Hypomone (Ὑπομονὴ), which is translated into English as Saint Patience.

== Life ==
Helena was the daughter of Serbian magnate Konstantin Dejanović, a Serbian magnate during the fall of the Serbian Empire that held Kyustendil. She was born into the Serbian Dejanović noble family. Her mother was Konstantin's unnamed first wife and Konstantin was the grandson of Serbian king Stefan III Dečanski. Her stepmother, Eudokia of Trebizond, was a daughter of Alexios III of Trebizond and Theodora Kantakouzene, and the widow of Tadjeddin Pasha of Sinop, Emir of Limnia.

Her father fell at the battle of Rovine (1395), while fighting as a vassal of Ottoman sultan Bayezid I against Mircea I of Wallachia.

=== Empress ===
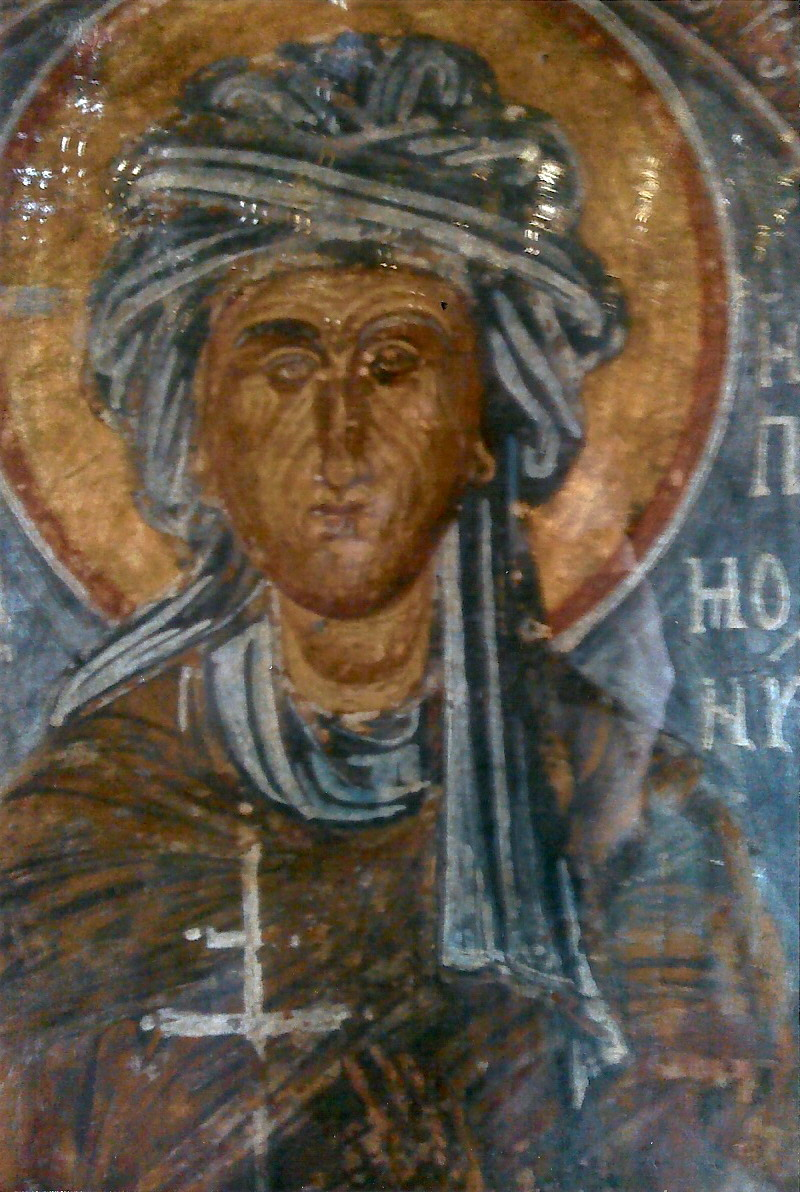
Icon of Helena Dragaš as Saint Hypomone, in Monastery of Saint Patapios, Loutraki, Greece

Helena married Manuel II Palaiologos in 1392. The wedding was followed by her coronation as "holy empress" the next day, on 11 February 1392. There are no preserved information to why the marriage was arranged, although it has been the subject of much speculation, but dynastic marriages between the Byzantine and Serbian dynasties were not unprecedented.

She had traditionally been described as well known for her beauty, piety, wisdom, and justice. Not much is known about her during her tenure as empress or her private relationship to Manuel II. When her spouse Manuel II was absent in 1393, he made his mother regent in his absence rather than his wife. Her relationship to her mother-in-law is unknown, but since she took the same name as her mother-in-law when she became a nun later in life, it has been theorized as a good one. In 1424, empress Helena is briefly mentioned when the court official Sphrantzes took a message from a supplicant to her instead of the aging emperor, as her son was absent, and that she was then in the company of her daughter-in-law, and that it was she who then passed the message on to the senior emperor.

In 1425, her husband abdicated and became a monk with the name Matthew (Ματθαῖος). After his death, on 21 July 1425, she became a nun at the Monastery of Kyra Martha, taking her monastic name Hyponyme. She helped to establish a home for old people, with the name "The Hope of the Despaired". The home was located at the Monastery of St. John in Petrion, where the relics of St. Patapius of Thebes are also kept.

=== Empress dowager ===
The fact that she made monastic vows did not necessarily mean that she had to leave the court and enter a convent. There is in fact more documentation of her during her tenure as empress dowager than as empress, and she played an influential role at court during the reign of her sons, acting as political adviser to both her sons John VIII and Constantine XI. There are many occasions in which her influence was illustrated. In 1439, when John VIII was in Italy, he was informed that the patriarch of Constantinople had died, but he refused to appoint a new one until he could consult his mother.

Empress dowager Helena Dragaš is known for her interest in ecclasiastical issues, and she was a prominent figure in the anti-unionist court fraction that opposed the proposed union between the Orthodox and Catholich church, which was a major political issue during the reign of John VIII, and for her conflict with the pro-union fraction. The fact that the issue of the church union was stalled and slowed down has been attributed to her influence, since her sons were in favor of union. Eventually, she did give her consent, or at least decided to no longer actively oppose, the union of churches, which was the wish of her son John VIII.

When her eldest son, John VIII, died in 1448, the succession was disputed between Constantine, her eldest remaining son and John's chosen heir, and his ambitious but inept younger brother, Demetrios. As empress dowager, Helena backed Constantine. She served as regent after the death of her son John VIII in 1448, until the arrival of his successor Constantine XI from Mistra in 1449 She eventually persuaded Sultan Murad II to intervene in Constantine's favour, leading to his assumption of the throne in January 1449.

When Constantine became emperor, he referred to himself as Constantine XI Dragases Palaiologos, after Helena. This suggests a close relationship between them, since there was no reason for why he should take his mothers last name; she herself had given it up after her marriage and always signed herself Palailogina, and Constantine was the only one of her sons to take her name. It is confirmed that Helena continued to act as political adviser also to her second reigning son Constantine IX, who after her death remarked that he missed his mothers insight and wisdom and her death had deprived him of a valuable advisor.

Helena was still a central figure of the anti-unionist Orthodoxy party at court, and it was said that Constantine and the anti-unionists were not brought together until after the death of Helena.

=== Death and legacy ===
Helena died on 23 March 1450 in Constantinople.

She is venerated by the Orthodox Church as a saint, and her memory is commemorated on 29 May, the day of the Fall of Constantinople to the Ottomans and of the death of her son Constantine XI.

== Marriage and issue ==
On 10 February 1392, Helena married Manuel II Palaiologos. They had several children. The list follows the order of births given by George Sphrantzes:

- A daughter. Mentioned as the eldest daughter but not named. Possibly confused with Isabella Palaiologina, an illegitimate daughter of John V Palaiologos known to have married Ilario Doria.
- Constantine Palaiologos. Died young.
- John VIII Palaiologos (18 December 1392 – 31 October 1448). Byzantine emperor, 1425–1448.
- Theodore II Palaiologos (d. 1448).
- A second daughter. Also not named in the text.
- Andronikos Palaiologos (d. 1429).
- Michael Palaiologos. Died young.
- Constantine XI Palaiologos (8 February 1405 – 29 May 1453). Despotēs in the Morea and subsequently the last Byzantine emperor, 1448–1453.
- Demetrios Palaiologos (c. 1407–1470). Despotēs in the Morea.
- Thomas Palaiologos (c. 1409 – 12 May 1465). Despotēs in the Morea.

== Sources ==
- Barker, John W. (1969). Manuel II Palaeologus (1391-1425): A Study in Late Byzantine Statesmanship. Rutgers University Press.
- Çelik, Siren (2021). Manuel II Palaiologos (1350–1425): A Byzantine Emperor in a Time of Tumult. Cambridge University Press.
- Garland, Lynda (2002). Byzantine Empresses: Women and Power in Byzantium AD 527-1204. Taylor & Francis.
- Philippides, Mario (2018). Constantine XI Dragaš Palaeologus (1404–1453): The Last Emperor of Byzantium. Taylor & Francis.
- Sullivan, Alice Isabella (2020). Byzantium in Eastern European Visual Culture in the Late Middle Ages. Brill.

Helena Dragaš House of Dejanović Born: 1372 Died: 1450
Royal titles
Vacant Title last held by Helena Kantakouzene	Byzantine Empress consort 1392–1425 with Irene Gattilusio (1397–1408); Anna of Moscow (1416–1417)	Succeeded by Sophia of Montferrat
