= Patapios =

Christian saint

Saint Patapios
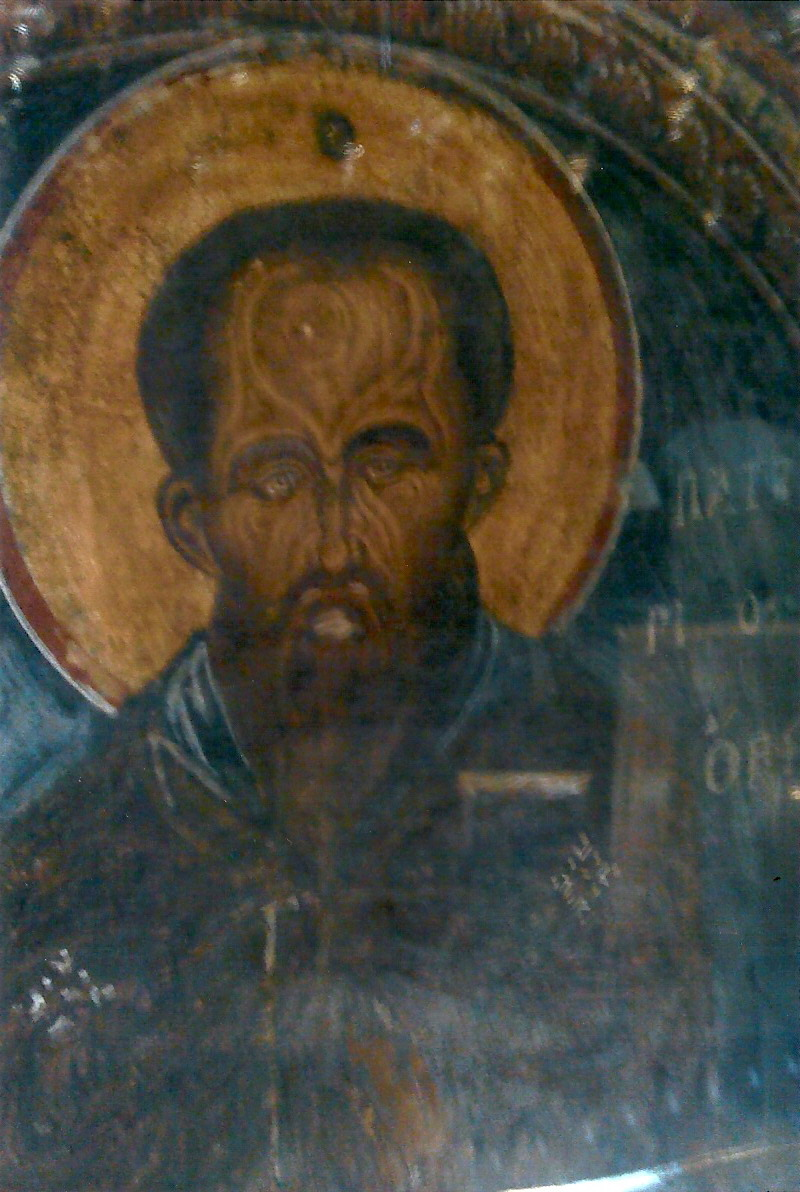
- Saint Patapios icon
- Born: 4th century Thebes, Roman Egypt
- Venerated in: Roman Catholic Church; Oriental Catholicism; Oriental Orthodox Churches; Eastern Orthodox Churches
- Feast: December 8, Tuesday after Easter

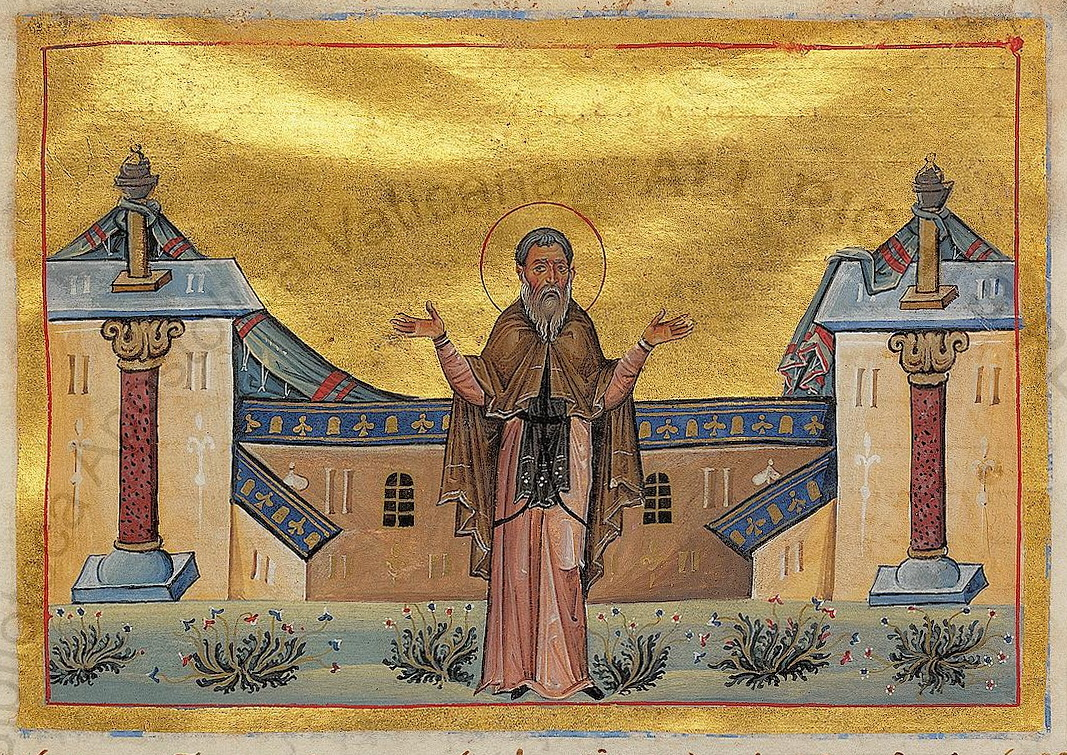

Patapios of Thebes (fl. 4th century AD) is the patron saint of those suffering from dropsy. Saint Patapios’ memory is celebrated on 8 December (main celebration) and also at the Tuesday 2 days after the Sunday of Easter (in memory of the day that his relic was discovered). His relic is kept at the female monastery of Saint Patapios at Loutraki, a spa town near Athens, Greece.

== Biography ==
Patapios was born in the 4th century AD in Thebes, Roman Egypt, to wealthy Christian parents. Patapios, at a young age, lived the life of a hermit in the desert. Many visited him to take his advice and to listen to his preaching. Later in his life, Patapios left Thebes and the desert for Constantinople. There he met two other ascetics, Varas and Ravoulas, who both became saints. Saint Ravoulas was hermit at the gate of Romanos. Saint Varas built the monastery of St John the Baptist at Petrion.

Patapios lived in the area of Blachernae at the Xero Oros (dry mountain) and he established a monastery, the Monastery of the Egyptians, where he eventually died.

== Veneration of his relic ==
=== Early history ===
Patapios' relic after the destruction of the Monastery of the Egyptians in 536 AD was transferred by Saint Varas to the Monastery of Saint John at Petrion, which during the last centuries of the Byzantine Empire was under the protection of the royal family of Constantinople, the Palaiologoi, and especially the Augusta Helena Dragaš, the mother of the last Byzantine emperor, Constantine XI Palaiologos, who became a nun and a saint under the monastic name of Saint Hypomone ("patience").

After the conquest of Constantinople by the Ottoman Empire in 1453, a relative of the Palailogos emperors and nephew of the Augusta Helena, Aggelis Notaras, in order to protect the relic of Saint Patapios from the Ottomans, transferred it to Mount Geraneia in southern Greece, near the town Thermai (Loutraki). There he hid it in a cave and a hermitage was established, but some centuries later it was abandoned. The cave where the relic of Saint Patapios was transferred had itself functioned as a hermitage since the 11th century AD. It is located at a height of 650 meters (2132 feet).

=== The discovery of the cave and the foundation of the monastery ===
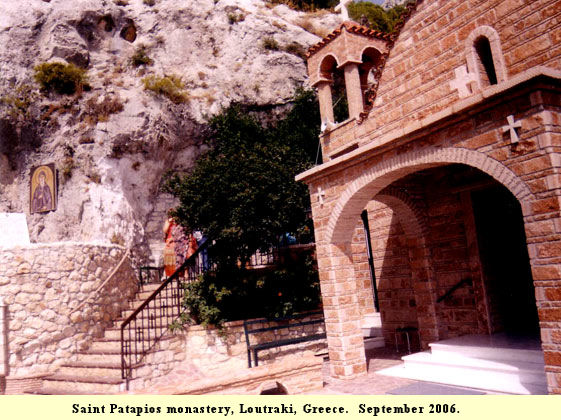
Monastery of Saint Patapios, Loutraki, Greece, September 2006. The entrance to the cave of Saint Patapios can be seen at the left.

The cave with the relic of the saint was discovered in 1904 by citizens of Loutraki. In the cave they found also the skull of Helena Dragaš, known as Saint Hypomone. However, some visitors from the cave took pieces of the relics of St Patapios as an amulet, as Sister Patapia mentions. Then, a priest from Loutraki, father Constantinos Susannis, took the relic of Patapios and kept it at home with the permission of the church to keep it away from vandals. Originally they found in the cave an despoiled wooden cross, a membrane and coins which were delivered to the authorities. Later in 1952, Father Nektarios (in the world Kyriakos) Marmarinos, a priest from the Synoikismos (meaning settlement) of Corinth (and later chancellor in the diocese of Corinth), who was originated from Aegina (and was student of St. Jerome), founded at the monastery and the relic returned to the cave where it was found. The official founding of the monastery took place on August 1, 1952, by Metropolitan of Korinth Prokopios Tzavaras.

The first abbess in the monastery in 1952, was sister Synglitiki. Sister Patapia helped at the establishment and building of the monastery. She was mother superior from 1963 to 1970, when she resigned because of health problems. The next and current mother superior is sister Isidora.

Father Nektarios, the founder of the monastery, is still visiting the monastery. He has a rich Christian work and has established other monasteries as the male monastery The 3 Hierarchs (near the village Perachora) and a summer camp for children (called Bethlehem). He has also created a female nursing home in Loutraki (where nuns serve the elderly women). Today Elder Nektarios has retired. He has received numerous awards from the Church of Corinth which was chancellor. Even today, though in old age, every Sunday in the settlement of Corinth makes it even lectures on Christian content and Sunday school.

=== The Monastery of St. Patapios today ===
The monastery includes the hostels, cells for the 40 nuns, a church dedicated to the Virgin Mary, the cemetery (with the chapel of St. Mary of Egypt) and the katholikon of the Holy Trinity. Finally there is an exhibition room for the visitors. The Cave of St. Patapios is beside the church. There they keep the holy relic of the saint, covered with a robe (that changes every year in the day if the saints' celebration). In the cave there are Byzantine icons (including St. Patapios and St. Patience) by an unknown artist, which were painted probably in the 15th century. Many visitors take as a single amulet from the cave a bit of cotton soaked with holy oil (from the hanging oil - lamp burning in the cave of the Saint) and also take holy water from a source adjacent to the cave. The skull of Saint Hypomone, known as Helena Dragaš, is also kept at Saint Patapios' nunnery.

In the monastery of St. Patapios live 40 nuns. It is located in Greece, mountain Gerania at an altitude of 650 meters (2132 feet) and is close to Loutraki (known resort located 1 hour from the capital Athens). The monastery overlooks the sea and Loutraki. Entering the monastery of St. Patapios we encounter the church Virgin Mary. The church was sanctified on August 1, 1968, by the Metropolitan bishop of Korinth Panteleimon. Inside the church we see an icon in center with the saint that celebrates that day. On the right we see the image of St. Patapios which is across the icon of Virgin Mary on the wall, which is full of offerings (from miracles). You can also see the image of St. Hipomoni left which is across the large picture of St. Patapios on the wall who is with Saint Hypomone, known as Helena Dragaš, and Saint Nikon the New. Adjucent the church of Virgin Mary, is the church of Agioi (Saints) Anargyroi.

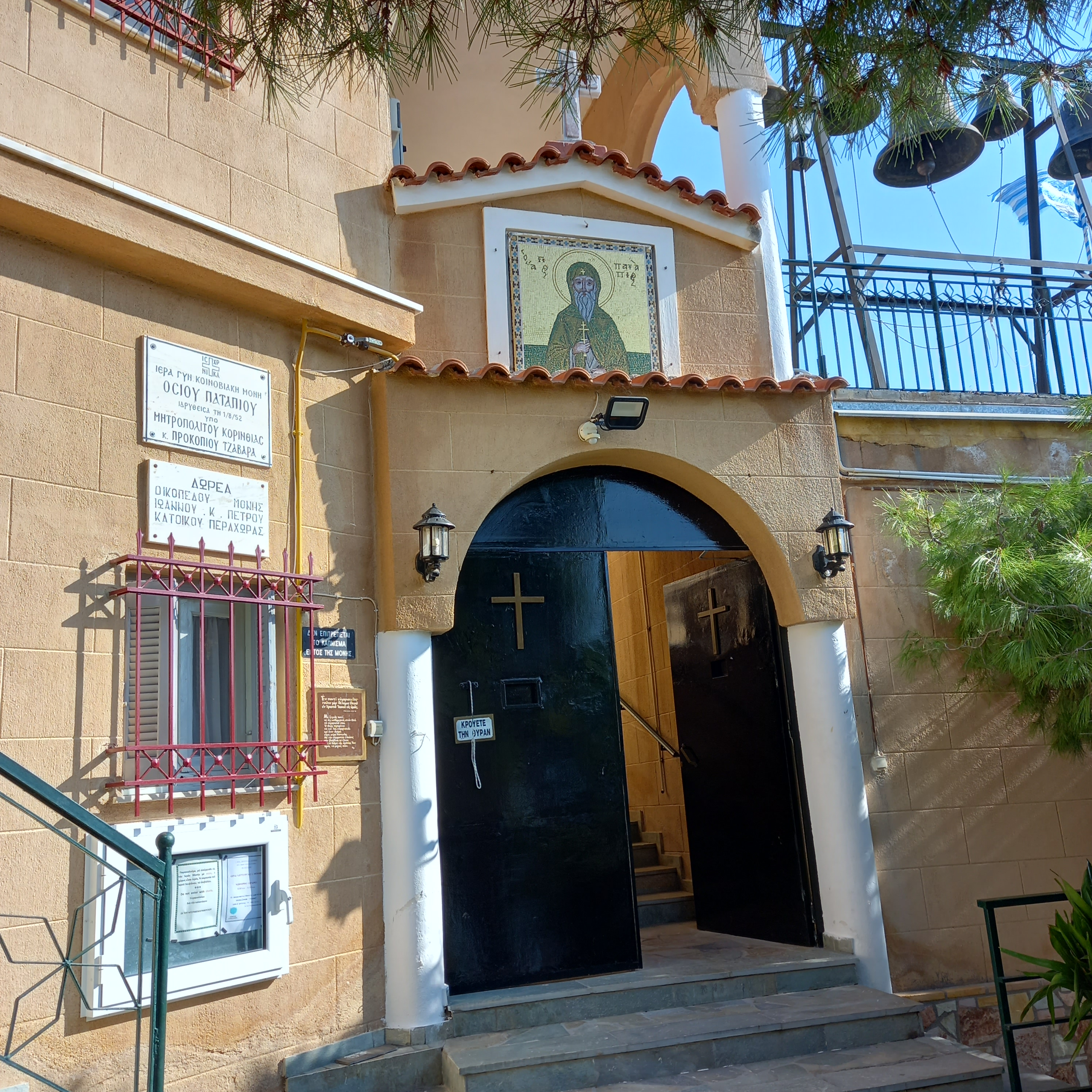
Main entrance to the Monastery of Saint Patapios, November 2022

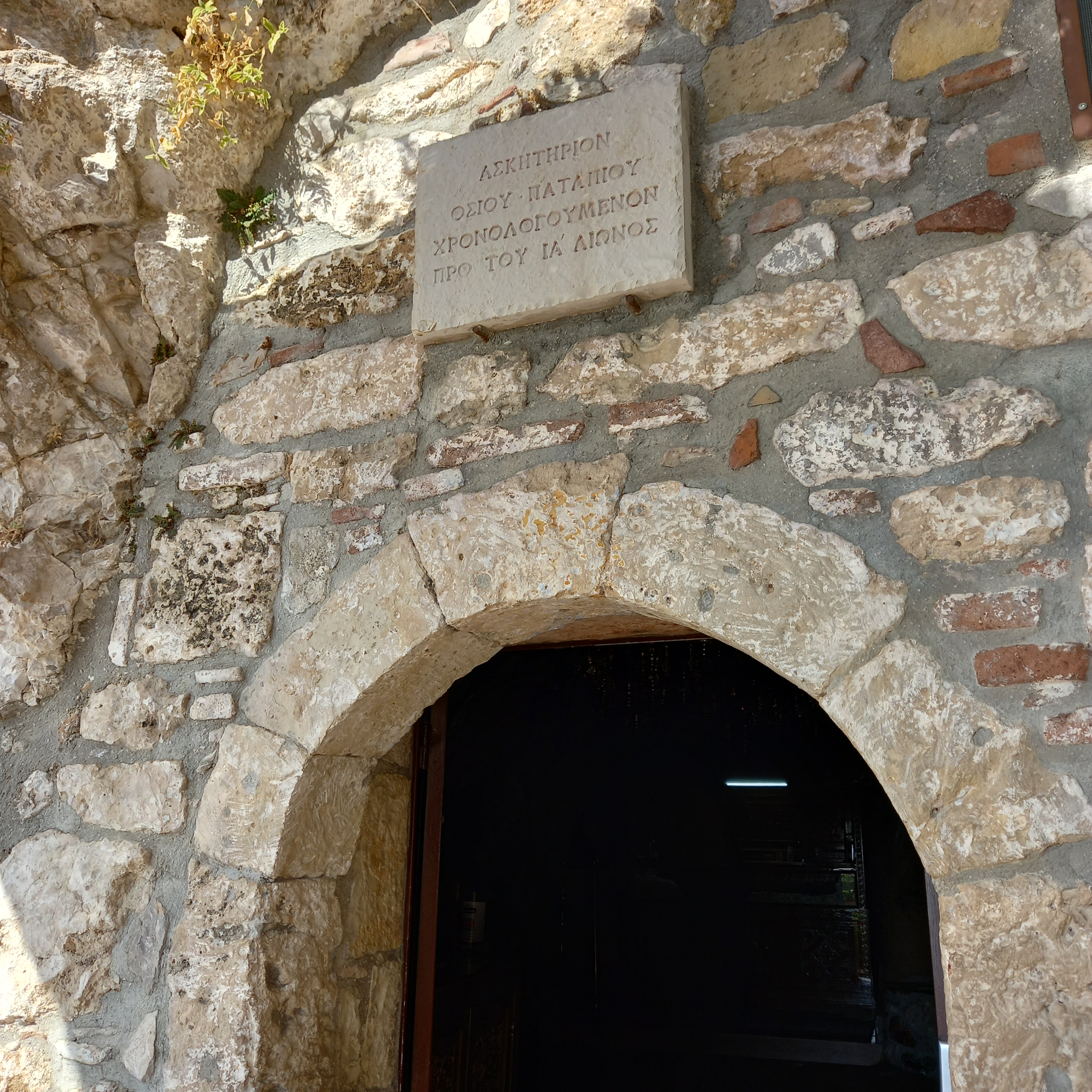
Entrance to the cave of Saint Patapios, November 2022

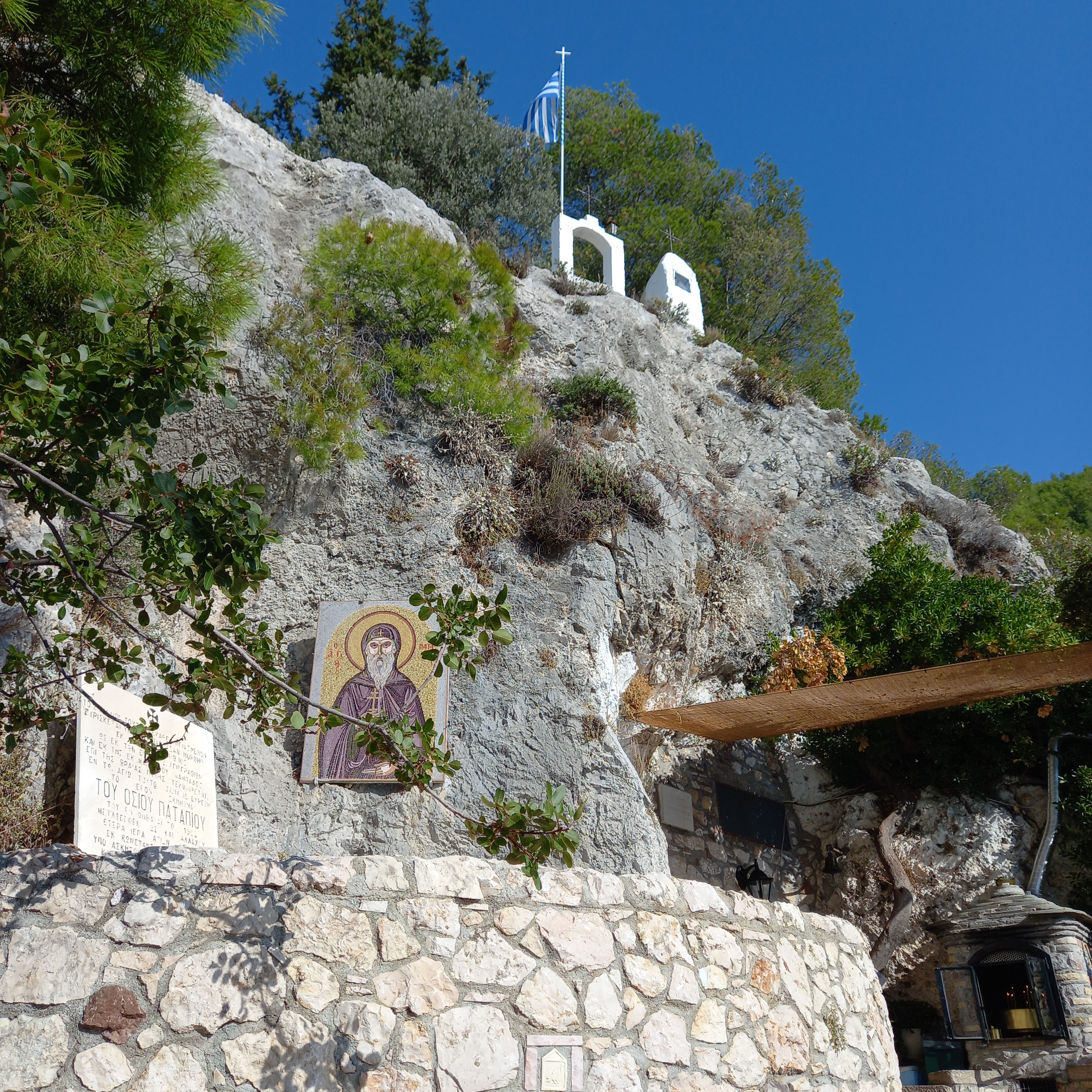
Monastery of Saint Patapios, November 2022

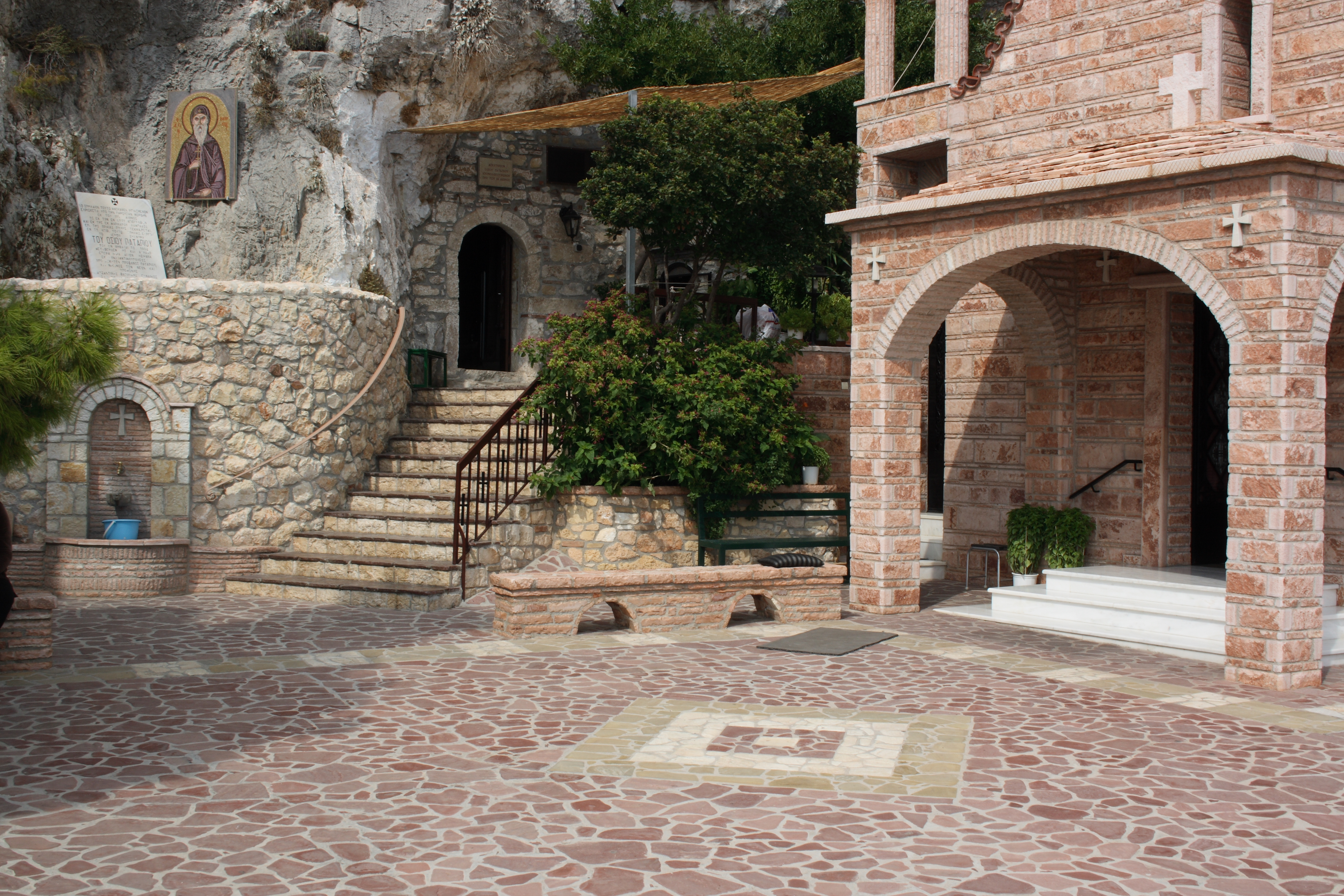
View of the cave entrance (left) and the main church (right)

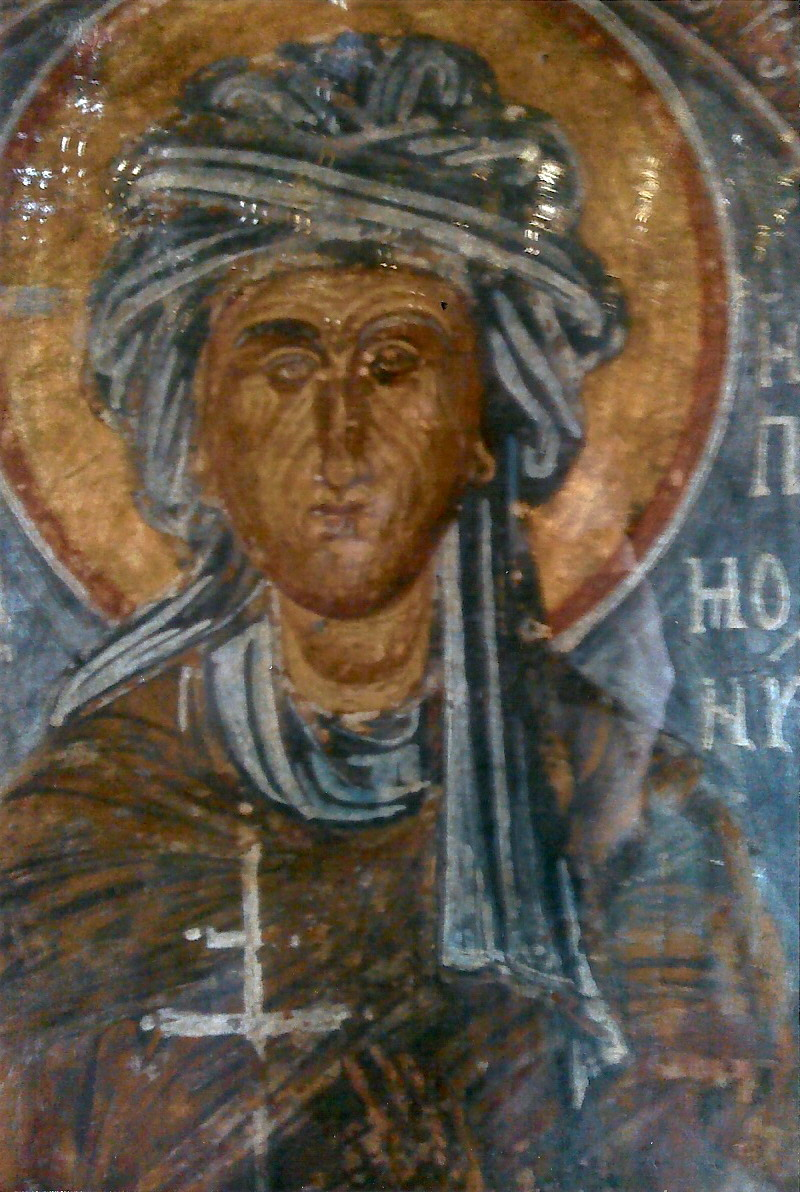
Saint Hipomoni (St Patience) icon

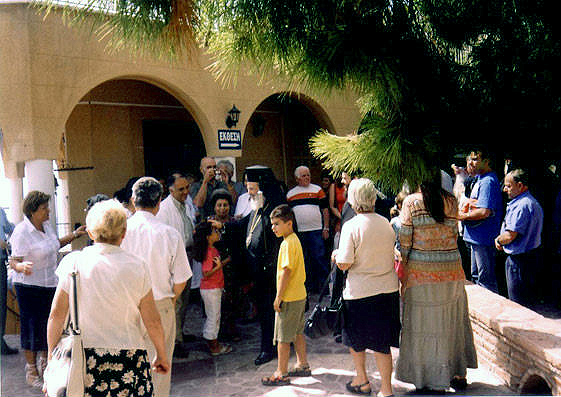
His Reverence Archbishop Christodoulos visits Saint Patapios monastery. September 2006

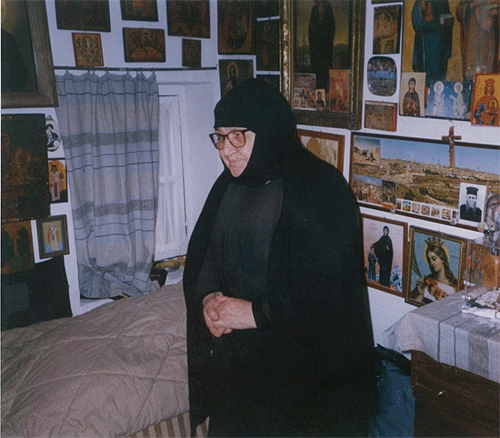
Sister Patapia, 2008

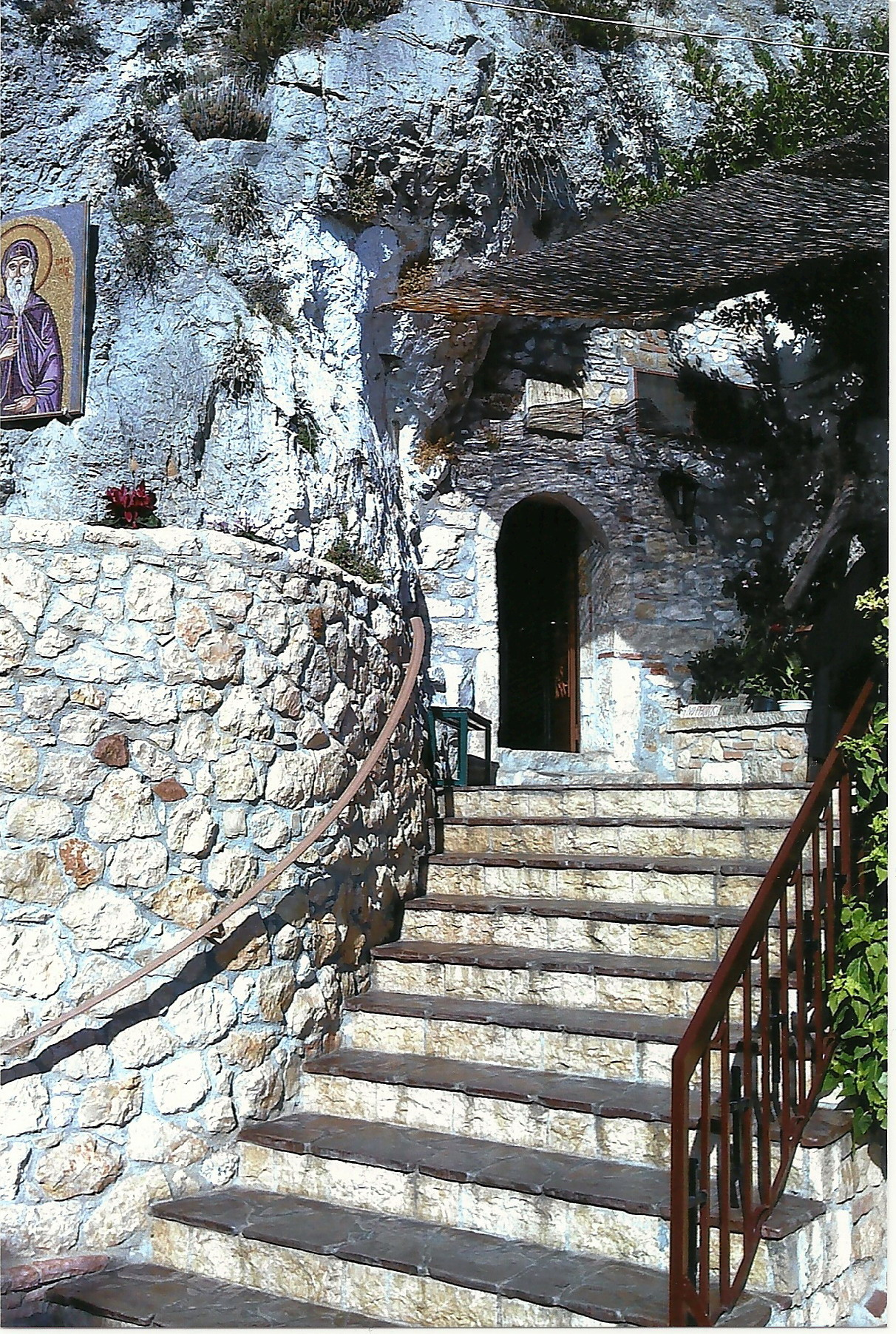
The nunnery of Saint Patapios, November 2010

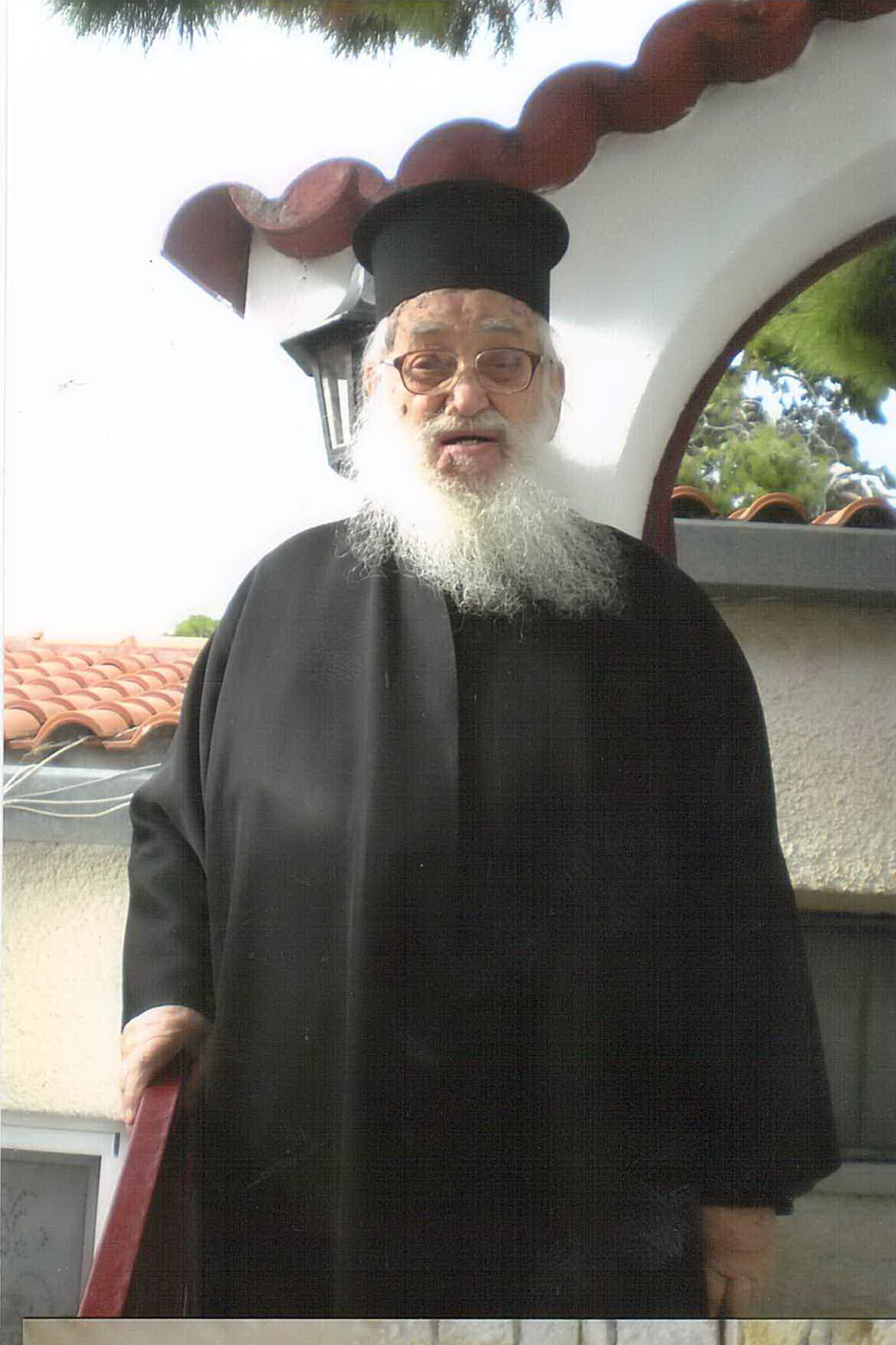
Father Nectarios, the establisher of the monastery of Saint Patapios, at the monastery at the annual celebration of the saint, 8 December 2012

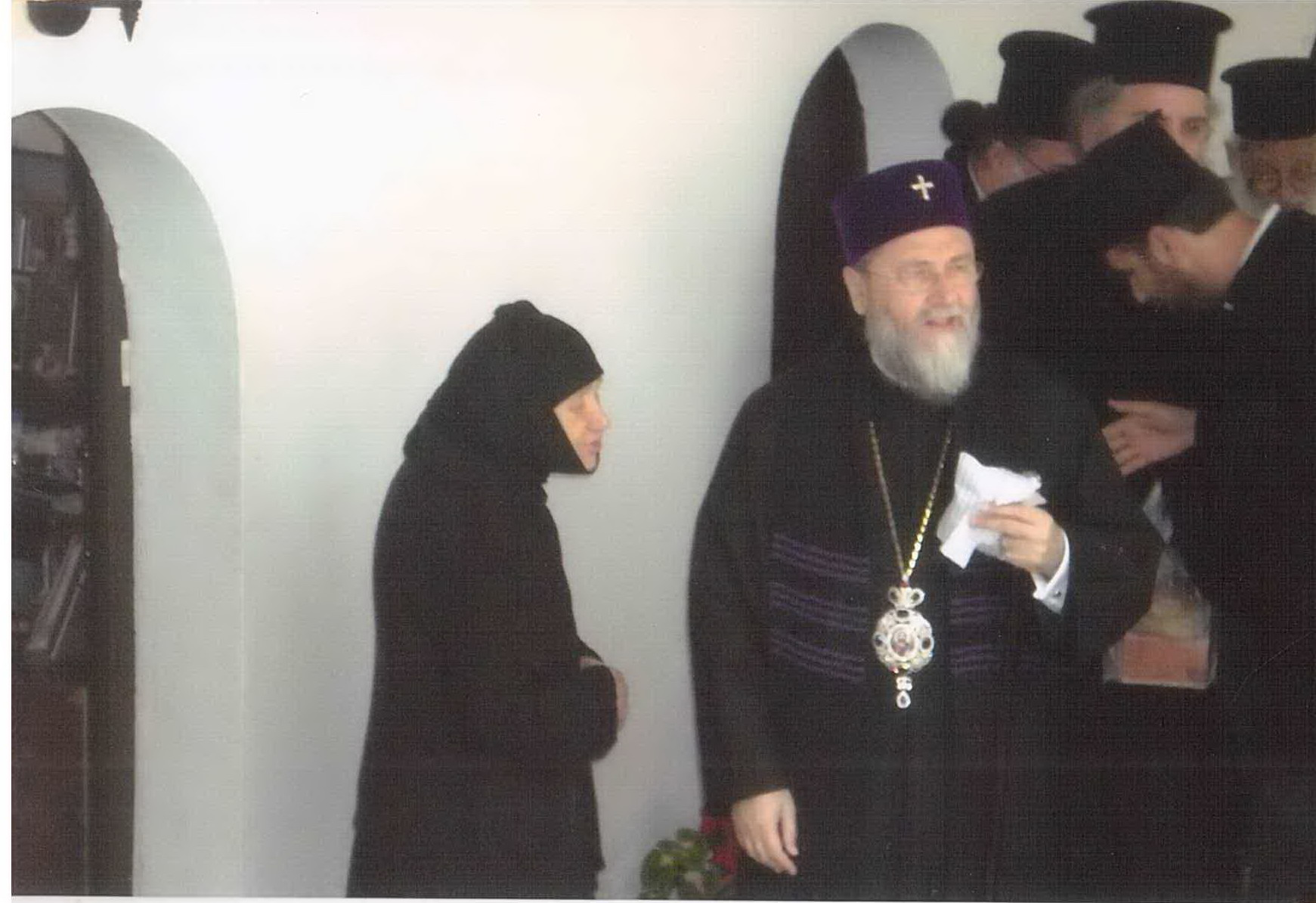
His Reverence bishop of Corinth Dionysius Mantalos, with sister Patapia at the monastery of saint Patapios, at the annual celebration of the saint, 8 December 2012

== Miracles ==
Saint Patapios is well known for the miracles that he did in the past and still does nowadays, which are recorded with full details in the historical archives of the monastery which maintains a large library.

== Veneration ==
The memory of Patapios is celebrated on December 8; and also Tuesday after Easter (as a remembrance of the day of finding the relic). The holy skull of Saint Hypomone, known as Helena Dragaš, is also kept in the monastery of St. Patapios.

== See also ==
- Potap (name)
