= Potapov =

Potapov (masculine, Russian: Потапов) or Potapova (feminine, Russian: Потапова) is a Russian patronymic surname derived from the given name Potap. Notable people with the surname include:

- Aleksandr Potapov (1818–1886), Russian statesman
- Anastasia Potapova (born 2001), Russian-Austrian tennis player
- Leonid Potapov (1935–2020), Russian politician
- Leonid Potapov (ethnographer) (1905–2000), Russian ethnographer
- Maksim Potapov (born 1980), Russian ice hockey player
- Mikhail Feofanovich Potapov (1921–1943), Soviet artillery captain
- Mikhail Ivanovich Potapov, Major General of the 5th Guards Combined Arms Army
- Viktor Potapov (1947–2017), Soviet–Russian sailor
- Viktor Pavlovich Potapov (1934–2021), Soviet–Russian naval aviation officer
- Vladimir Potapov (1914–1980), Soviet–Ukrainian mathematician

== See also ==
- 13480 Potapov, a main-belt asteroid
