= Sergejs Potapkins =

Latvian politician

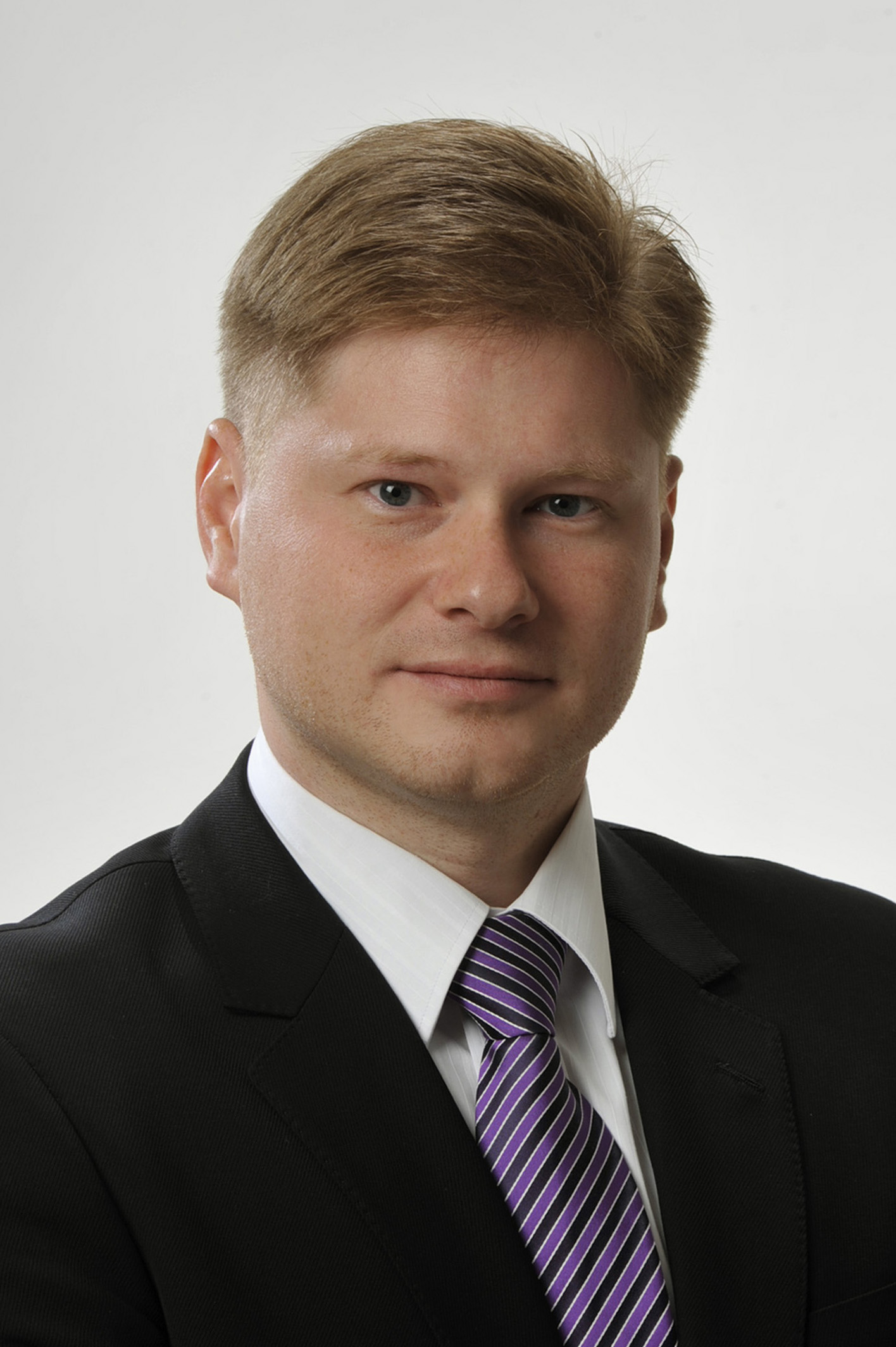

Former Deputy of the Saeima

Personal details
- Born: 30 November 1977 (age 48) Latvian SSR
- Party: Harmony

Sergejs Potapkins (born 1977) is a researcher of Latvian Institute of International Affairs. Former member and deputy chairman of the Foreign Affairs Committee of the Latvian Parliament (Saeima). He was also Chairman of the Latvia-Armenia and Latvia-China interparliamentary cooperation group. Alumni of Munich Young Leaders Network 2015, and Associate Contributor of Agora Strategy Group AG. Sergejs Potapkins has obtained a Master's degree from the Faculty of European Studies, Riga Stradins University. Research interests of Sergejs Potapkins include the Global South, China and India, security issues, as well as the South Caucasus region and Armenia in particular. In 2016, Potapkins was awarded the Memorial Award of the National Assembly.
