= Cyngar of Llangefni =

Saint Cyngar was a 5th-century Welsh Saint. He is the Patron Saint of Llangefni, Anglesey, in Wales, and a founding member of St. Cybi's Monastery at Holyhead, Anglesey.

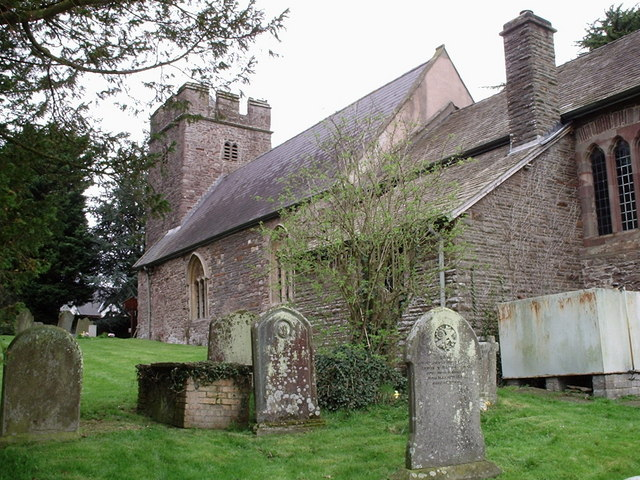
Church of St Cybi in Llangybi

Born around 488 AD, he was the son of King Gerren Llyngesog of Dumnonia. As a mature man, he became a follower of his nephew, St. Cybi Felyn, whom he accompanied to Edeligion in South Wales where they built churches in Llangybi-upon-Usk and Llanddyfrwyr-yn-Edeligion before King Glywys of Glywysing forced them to leave. They then went to the island of Aran Mor in Ireland where they spent four years building churches, after which they moved to the Llŷn Peninsula at Cricieth.

They finally established an important monastery at Holyhead, Anglesey, from where Cyngar founded the church at Llangefni.

Ynys Cyngar, once an offshore island but now a coastal headland is located at the mouth of the Afon Glaslyn near Borth y Gest (Grid Ref: SH 5535 3658), where the Church in Wales church is dedicated to St Cyngar.

He died on 7 November of an unknown year in the mid-6th century (probably 550 AD) and he was buried in Llangefni.
