= Llanddewi Court =

- Location within Monmouthshire
- 51.673°N 2.988°W
- Type: House
- Location: Llangybi, Monmouthshire

History
- Built: late 16th century

Site notes
- Architectural style: Vernacular architecture
- Governing body: Privately owned

Listed Building – Grade II*
- Official name: Llanddewi Court
- Designated: 4 March 1952
- Reference no.: 2676

Listed Building – Grade II
- Official name: Oxhouse at Llanddewi Court
- Designated: 4 March 1952
- Reference no.: 2677

Listed Building – Grade II
- Official name: Barn at Llanddewi Court
- Designated: 18 November 1980
- Reference no.: 2678

Llanddewi Court, Llangybi, Monmouthshire, Wales, is a Grade II* listed house dating from the late 16th century. It is an example of a "double-house", a building in two sections, originally without interconnections, and designed to accommodate two families.

== History and architecture ==
Cadw gives a construction date for the court of the late 16th century, although the architectural historian John Newman describes it as 15th century in origin. Sir Cyril Fox and Lord Raglan, in the second of their multi-volume history, Monmouthshire Houses, describe Llanddewi as a "double house – in two parts apparently without contemporary intercommunication". Later historians, including those responsible for the Cadw listing, are less certain, noting the close similarities to the White Hart Inn in nearby Llangybi which had a contemporary connecting passage. The house, still a private home, has been altered in subsequent centuries, although Newman and Cadw disagree as to the extent of this rebuilding, Newman describing the court as "much enlarged, altered and modernized" while Cadw contends that the exterior has seen little alteration, although it acknowledges significant internal modernization.

Llanddewi Court is of two storeys and is constructed of old red sandstone rubble which has been whitewashed in parts. The roof is of Welsh slate. The building has a Grade II* listing, in recognition of its "specially interesting" plan. The court's barn, and its ox house have their own Grade II listings.
