= Nantybanw, Llantrisant =

Nantybanw
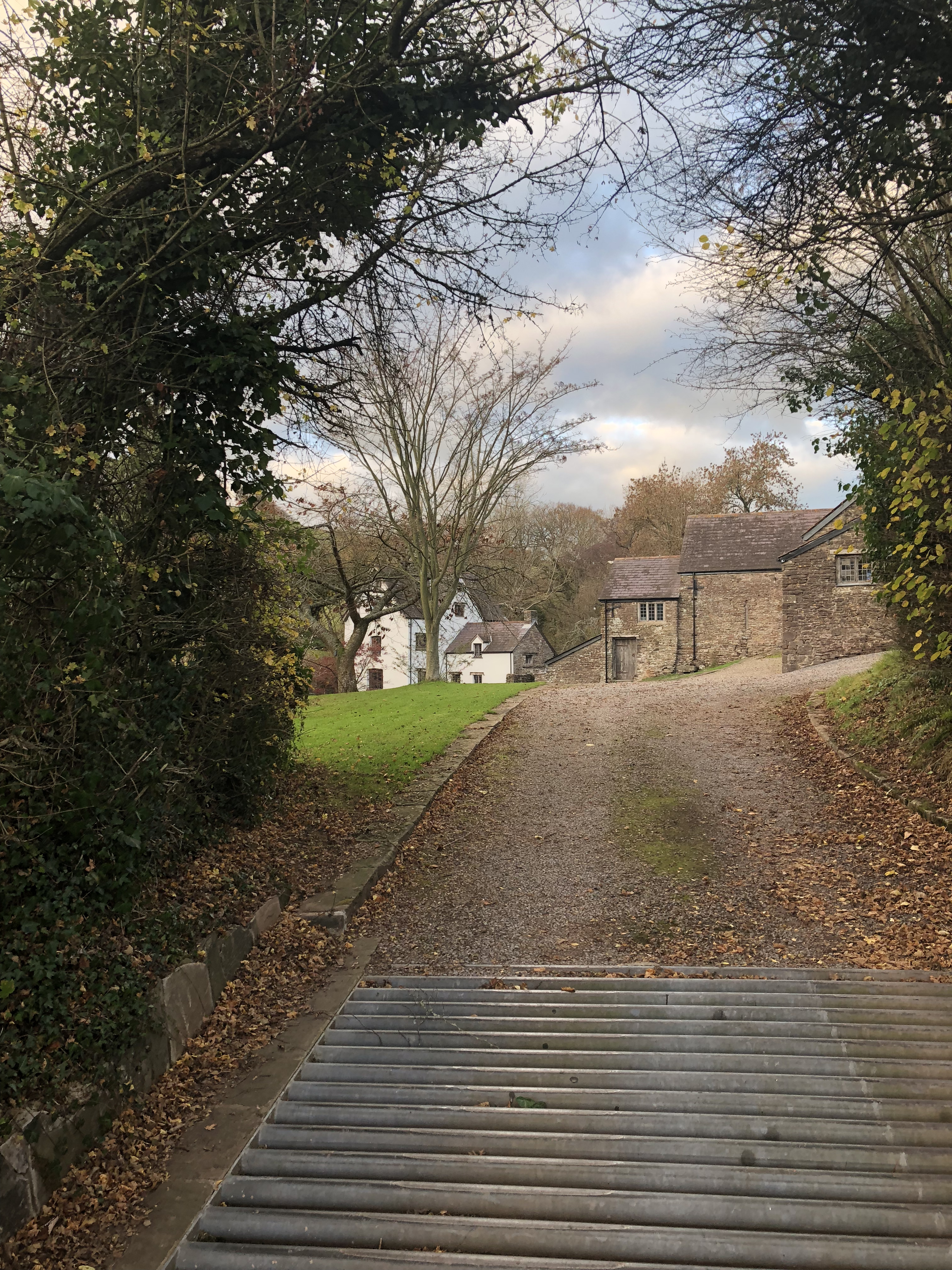
- "An important early 17th century house"

- Location within Monmouthshire
- 51.6709°N 2.8585°W
- Type: House
- Location: Llantrisant, Monmouthshire

History
- Built: 1625

Site notes
- Architectural style: Vernacular
- Governing body: Privately owned

Listed Building – Grade II*
- Official name: Nantybanw
- Designated: 4 March 1952
- Reference no.: 2716

Listed Building – Grade II
- Official name: Barn range at Nantybanw
- Designated: 22 June 2000
- Reference no.: 23500

Listed Building – Grade II
- Official name: Cider House at Nantybanw
- Designated: 22 June 2000
- Reference no.: 23501

Listed Building – Grade II
- Official name: Mill house at Nantybanw
- Designated: 22 June 2000
- Reference no.: 23502

Nantybanw, Llantrisant in Monmouthshire, Wales is a country house dating from 1625. The house is Grade II* listed and the associated farm buildings have their own Grade II listings.

== History ==
Nantybanw has a datestone of 1625 and was long-thought to have been constructed entirely in that mid-17th century period. Recent research shows a more confused genesis. RCAHMW suggests that a reconstruction c.1600 of an earlier house, was continued by the addition of extensions dating from 1625. The house was reconstructed in the 19th century and fully restored in the 20th. This restoration saw the inclusion of doors and doorcases from a demolished house, Graig Olway, Llangeview, and the insertion of a new staircase modelled on that at Upper Dyffryn House, Grosmont. Nantybanw remains a private residence.

== Architecture and description ==
The house is of two storeys, with attics, and is constructed to a T-plan. It is built of whitewashed rubble. The architectural historian John Newman, notes the "typical but not especially rich timber fittings" of the interior. Peter Smith records the house as possessing examples of the "typical Welsh ornate doorheads" in his work Houses of the Welsh Countryside. The house is listed Grade II*, its listing record describing it as "an important early 17th century house (with a) great deal of surviving original detail". The associated barn range, cider barn and mill house have their own, Grade II, listings.
