= Caer Gybi =

Caer Gybi may refer to:

- Caer Gybi (fort), the small Roman fort and site of Saint Cybi's monastery at Holyhead, Wales
- the Welsh name for Holyhead, the settlement which grew up around the fort
