= Adam of Usk =

Welsh canonist and historian, c. 1352–1430

Adam of Usk (Welsh: Adda o Frynbuga, c. 1352–1430) was a Welsh priest, canonist, and late medieval historian and chronicler. His writings were hostile to King Richard II of England.

== Patronage ==
Born at Usk in what is now Monmouthshire (Sir Fynwy), south-east Wales, Adam received the patronage of Edmund Mortimer, 3rd Earl of March, who inherited the Lordship of Usk (Brynbuga) through his wife Philippa. Mortimer encouraged and enabled Adam to eventually study at Oxford, where he obtained his doctorate and became extraordinarius in Canon law.

Adam settled at the University of Oxford as a teacher of law. Here by his own admission he was involved in armed struggle in 1388 and 1389 between the Northerners and the Southerners, which included the Welsh.

Adam left Oxford and practised his profession for seven years as an advocate in the archiepiscopal court of Canterbury, 1390–1397, sitting on the Parliament of 1397. In 1399 he accompanied the Archbishop and Bolingbroke's army on the march from Bristol to Chester. These experiences and the connection with Thomas Arundel shaped his views thereafter. He was hostile in his chronicle to Richard II, was a member of the commission appointed to find secure legal grounds for his deposition, and met with the King during his captivity in the Tower of London.

Adam was rewarded for his part in Richard II's surrender, imprisonment and fall by being granted the living of Kemsing and Seal, and later made a prebend in the church of Bangor. These nicely supplemented his professional legal income and status. However one living, his title to the prebend of Llandygwydd in Cardiganshire given under the college of Abergwili, was contested by one Walter Jakes, alias Ampney, who had obtained it by exchange in 1399. The two were in an affray, in Westminster, in November 1400, which resulted in charges being brought against Adam and his company for highway robbery. The outcome is unknown, however it did not immediately limit his legal activities, as he continued as a lawyer.

Adam was strongly devoted to Saint Teilo (associated with Llandaff Cathedral) and to Saint Thomas of India, whose cult had been vitalised by Dominican missions in Asia.

== Rome ==
However, Adam forfeited the King's favour and was either effectively banished or chose to leave England for Rome in February 1402 with the sanction of the Crown, having begged for the King's pardon for the Westminster misdeed, which pardon was granted in January 1403. There Adam realised he could impress other influential people. Once in Rome he met Pope Boniface IX and Pope Innocent VII, both of whom were sufficiently impressed to offer him English bishoprics in 1404. He was later successively nominated to the sees of Hereford and St David's, but was unable to obtain possession of either. Antipope Benedict XIII also nominated him to Llandaff.

Events outside his influence or control took over. The rebellion of Owain Glyndŵr was enveloping Wales and focusing attention from England. In the summer of 1405 riots swept Rome, driving the Pope from the city in August, stranding Adam and leaving him far from home, separated from patronage and exacerbated by Adam's own dangerous illness, suffered probably as a result. Adam left Rome in June 1406, making his way to Bruges. Here he attended closely to events in Wales and England and again developed his legal work, in France and Flanders this time. He listened to the plans of Henry Percy, 1st Earl of Northumberland, to overthrow King Henry IV, but adroitly avoided any implication, involvement or commitment to either side.

In 1408 Adam was ready to return to Wales, landed at Barmouth, and hoped to secure the Lordship of Powis, then held by Edward Cherleton – whose first wife's dower had included the Lordship of Usk. Adam lived under Cherleton's protection for some years at this period, as a poor Chaplain at Welshpool.

== Legacy ==
In March 1411 Adam was granted a royal pardon, which should have signalled his return to influence. However, in 1414 Thomas Arundel died and a major patron's influence was removed. Adam spent the rest of his life and career in relative obscurity. In 1423 he was the incumbent of St Cybi's Church, Llangybi, Monmouthshire, near his birthplace. He died in 1430 and was buried in the priory church at Usk, where his epitaph, composed in Welsh cywydd metre, can still be seen. His will, also preserved, includes bequests to Llandaff Cathedral and to friaries in Newport and Cardiff as well as to individual persons bearing Welsh names. He makes a legacy to his executor and one to a relative, one Edward ab Adam, quite a telling gift: Adam's own copy of Ranulf Higden's Polychronicon, maybe his own inspiration as a young boy. With it he must have left the material that formed his chronicle to 1421, which twenty years later was put in manuscript form.

This chronicle is his major legacy, providing contemporary detail on events in Wales, England and abroad and an insight into the life of an educated man moving through important spheres of influence at the time. He met Kings and Popes, chronicled the Peasants' Revolt (the chronicle opens with a description of Jack Straw) and the Byzantine Emperor Manuel II Palaiologos's Christmas visit to Richard II, lived in various cities and towns, but was often on the move. Observant of phenomena from his youth, Adam is struck by the beauty of Lake Lucerne and the quality of Beaune wine, but draws a pessimistic conclusion about the night-time behaviour of Rome's canine population. He offered a useful interpretation of the history of his times. The chronicle throws particular light on the Owain Glyndŵr revolt. The interest of the content is generally far superior to the Latinity of the work.

The Chronicle survives in a single manuscript. At some point, the final quire of the manuscript became separated from the manuscript. This was discovered in 1885 at Belvoir Castle, where it remains. The main manuscript is in the British Library (Add. MS 10104).

His Latin chronicle of English history from 1377 to 1421 was edited and translated by Edward Maunde Thompson for the Royal Society of Literature, as Chronicon Adæ de Usk.

== See also ==
- Gerald of Wales
- Geoffrey of Monmouth
