= Treaty of Gallipoli =

1403 treaty between the Ottomans and Christian powers

- Type: Treaty of alliance between Süleyman Çelebi and the Byzantine Empire; peace and commercial treaty between Süleyman Çelebi and Genoa and Venice and their possessions and vassals in Greece
- Signed: January/February 1403
- Location: Gallipoli
- Signatories: Süleyman Çelebi; Byzantine Empire; Republic of Genoa; Republic of Venice

The Treaty of Gallipoli, concluded in January or early February 1403, was a peace treaty between Süleyman Çelebi, ruler of the Ottoman territories in the Balkans, and the main Christian regional powers: the Byzantine Empire, the Republic of Venice, the Republic of Genoa, the Knights Hospitaller, and the Duchy of Naxos. Concluded in the aftermath of the Battle of Ankara, while Süleyman tried to strengthen his own position in the succession struggle with his brothers, the treaty brought major concessions to the Christian states, especially the Byzantines, who regained lost territories and achieved a position of nominal superiority over the Ottoman ruler. Its provisions were honoured by Süleyman as well as by Mehmed I, the victor of the Ottoman succession struggle, but collapsed after Mehmed's death in 1421 because Manuel forced Murad II hand when he backed a pretender.

== Background ==
Main signatories of the treaty

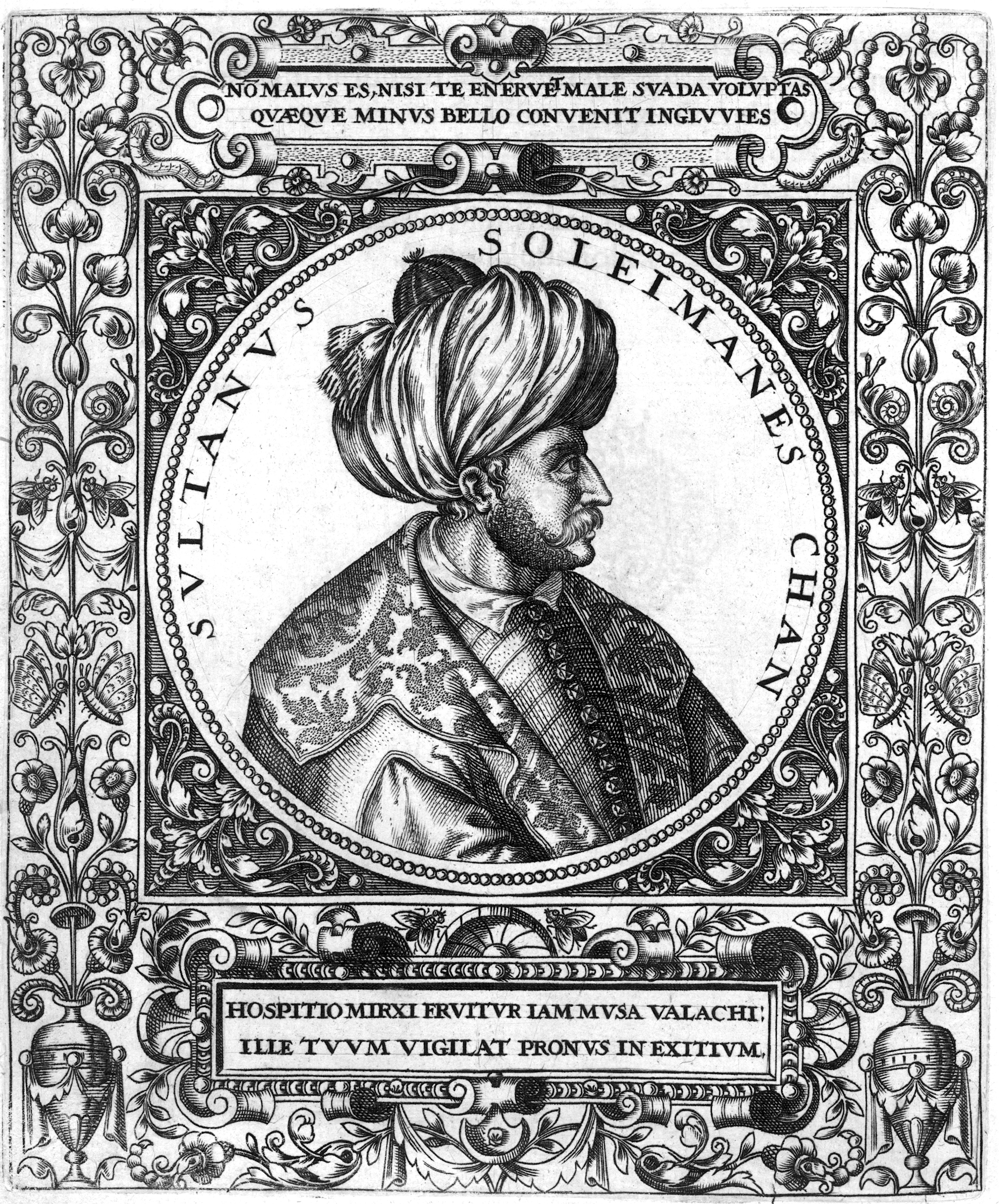
Fanciful late-16th-century representation of Süleyman Çelebi, the Ottoman prince who ruled Rumelia

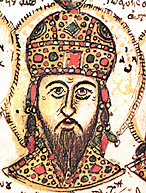
15th-century miniature portrait of John VII Palaiologos, regent for his uncle Manuel II

On 26 July 1402, in the Battle of Ankara, the Ottoman Sultan Bayezid I was defeated and captured by the Turco-Mongol warlord Timur. This momentous event overturned the balance of power in the region, as the Ottoman domains in Anatolia were divided by Timur, who restored many of the independent Turkish beyliks previously absorbed by Bayezid. Timur did not interfere with the Balkans, where the Ottoman conquest was also far advanced: before Ankara, Constantinople, almost the last remnant of the Byzantine Empire, was cut off and besieged by Bayezid. As in Anatolia, the sudden collapse of Ottoman power left a power vacuum, in which the various Christian powers of the region—the Byzantines, the Hungarians, the Republic of Venice, and a number of minor rulers—each tried to secure their interests as best possible, while being too weak to actually challenge Ottoman power.

Süleyman Çelebi, the eldest son of Bayezid, escaped the disaster at Ankara and arrived at Gallipoli on 20 August. While his other brothers were left in Anatolia to deal with Timur and try to salvage what domains they could, Süleyman claimed control over the Ottoman territories in the Balkans ("Rumelia"). His position there was insecure, however, and his first priority was to contact the Christian powers of the region and arrange a truce with them, especially in view of the necessity to one day return to Anatolia and contend with his brothers and other rivals (cf. Ottoman Interregnum). Already on 22 September, the Venetian Senate was discussing the matter, and hoped to gain control over Gallipoli. The Venetians also contacted the Byzantine emperor Manuel II Palaiologos, who at the time was in Paris on a grand journey seeking help in the West, urging him to return home, since Manuel's nephew and regent, John VII Palaiologos, was known to sympathize with Venice's maritime and commercial rivals, the Republic of Genoa.

Negotiations soon began, and Süleyman sent envoys both to Venice and Manuel, offering significant concessions. Manuel, however, would not return to Constantinople until 9 June 1403, and an agreement was reached during his absence, after negotiations lasting three and a half months. The Venetians, who among other concerns wanted to use Ottoman influence to settle their rivalry with the Florentine Antonio I Acciaioli, who had captured Athens, sent their most experienced diplomat, the lord of Andros, Pietro Zeno, as their negotiator, along with Marco Grimani, while Genoa named Jean de Chateaumorand as its envoy to the eastern potentates.

== Provisions ==
Map of the southern Balkans and western Anatolia in 1410, during the latter phases of the Ottoman Interregnum. The territories of the Ottoman Empire in the Balkans largely correspond to the provisions of the Treaty of Gallipoli

Judging from the fact that on 20 February scribes from Pera were being paid for their work in drafting the treaty, the agreement was concluded in January or early February 1403. A single copy of it survives, a poor Venetian translation of the Turkish original. Pietro Zeno also left an account of the negotiations with the Ottomans, where he states that the treaty was signed at Gallipoli. The provisions of the treaty were as follows:

1. Sultan Süleyman concluded "true peace" with the "great emperor of the Greeks [John VII Palaiologos], my father", as well as with "the great communes of Rhodes [the Knights Hospitaller], Venice, Genoa with the isle of Chios and the Duke of Naxos and with all the lands and islands that are theirs and their possessions in the Aegean Sea and the Black Sea".
2. To the Byzantine emperor, Sultan Süleyman ceded "Thessalonica and Kalamaria with all their related territory", the coast from "Gallikos up to the river Paravardaro", as well as all the land from Panidos (on the Marmara Sea) up to Mesembria (on the Black Sea) and the region of Palateoria with all its fortresses. The Byzantines were no longer required to pay tribute, and were free to erect fortresses as they pleased. The contemporary Byzantine historian Doukas gives a slightly different account, recording that Süleyman handed over "the regions of the Strymon as far as Zetounion, the Peloponnese and the lands surrounding [Constantinople] from Panidos to the Hieron Stomion [i.e., the Bosporus], and all the coastal fortresses situated along the Black Sea from the Hieron Stomion to Varna". These passages have been interpreted as implying that Süleyman ceded control of all coastal territories from the Strymon river down to Zetounion (modern Lamia), i.e. the larger part of coastal Macedonia (including Chalcidice) and the coast of Thessaly down to the Maliac Gulf. It is impossible to say with certainty how far inland that control extended.
3. Süleyman further ceded "all the castles that the emperor had possessed in Turkey". The return of some fortresses on the coasts of Anatolia is confirmed by the Byzantine historian Laonikos Chalkokondyles, but no details are known from Byzantine sources. The identity of at least some of these castles is provided by the Ottoman historian Ashikpashazade, who reports that c. 1419, Sultan Mehmed I recovered the forts of Hereke, Old Gebze, Darıca, Pendik and Kartal, on the northern shore of the Gulf of Nicomedia, which had been in Byzantine hands until then. However, Ashipashazade's phrasing also suggests that these fortresses remained contested with the Byzantines thereafter, and not until the reign of Mehmed II (r. 1444–1446, 1451–1481) were they definitely conquered by the Ottomans.
4. If Timur should attack Constantinople, Süleyman undertook to help defend it with his galleys and sailors.
5. Süleyman also returned the islands of the Northern Sporades: Skopelos, Skiathos, and Skyros. Their tribute was likewise annulled.
6. All citizens of Constantinople (i.e., of the Byzantine emperor) were allowed to return to their homes without any impositions.
7. All cases of litigation from the time of Süleyman's father and grandfather were dropped, except for cases of debts between individuals.
8. The Serbian ruler Stefan Lazarević was to be allowed to retain his lands, on the condition that he accepted the same obligations owed to Bayezid, i.e. pay tribute and provide military assistance.
9. All Frankish, Venetian, Genoese, Rhodian, and Greek merchants were free to trade in any territory possessed by Süleyman then or in the future, and would be obliged to pay in duties "what was usual before".
10. If a merchant commits a crime, no other merchants should be punished other than the perpetrator.
11. If a shipwreck should occur in Süleyman's territory, both goods and passengers would be returned.
12. All ports under Süleyman's control would be open to Christian merchants, who would be allowed to export grain without restrictions. The tax on each bushel (mozo) of grain, of the weight used in Constantinople, was set at one hyperpyron.
13. Süleyman's ships would not be allowed to leave the Dardanelles without permission from the Byzantine emperor and the Christian league.
14. All Byzantine prisoners held by Süleyman or any of his subordinate lords were to be released.
15. All Genoese prisoners held by Süleyman or any of his subordinate lords were to be released.
16. If a Genoese slave were to escape to Ottoman territory, he would be returned. Any Muslim held by the Genoese after Timur's attack would be released.
17. Twenty-five prisoners from Chios (a Genoese colony) held by the Ottomans were to be released.
18. The Genoese colonies in the Black Sea were relieved of the tribute to the Ottomans.
19. The tribute of 500 ducats paid until then by Chios to the Ottoman governor at Alto Luogo (Ayasoluk) would cease.
20. All territories, forts, dwellings, and anything else taken from the Venetians was to be restored to them, and Athens to return to their rule. The latter provision was never actually enforced, and Antonio I Acciaioli retained control of Athens.
21. The Venetians received a strip of land, five miles wide, on the Greek mainland opposite the whole length of the island of Euboea (a Venetian possession), but the Ottomans were to retain the salt flats and ports in the area. The Venetians also undertook to punish anyone taking grain from Ottoman territory without paying customs duties.
22. Süleyman agreed not to increase the tribute levied on the Marquisate of Bodonitsa from what it was under Bayezid, although the marquis had conspired against the Ottomans in Thessaly.
23. Slaves from both sides seeking to escape in the territory of the other would be returned.
24. The tribute of 200 ducats paid until then by Naxos would cease.
25. Süleyman would return 500 Venetian prisoners, provided the Venetians released all Ottoman prisoners they held.
26. The tribute of 500 ducats paid until then by New Phocaea (a Genoese colony) would cease.
27. The transfer of the County of Salona to the Knights Hospitaller by the Despot of the Morea, Theodore I Palaiologos, was ratified.

== Significance and aftermath ==
The treaty (or another treaty with similar provisions) was ratified anew once Emperor Manuel II returned from the West later in the year. The treaty was very unpopular with the Ottomans due to its concessions, but the need to keep his rear secure while engaged in the civil war of the Ottoman Interregnum with his brothers forced Süleyman to adhere to it until his own overthrow in 1411. Nevertheless, the opposition of the powerful Ottoman frontier warlords (uch bey), such as Evrenos Beg, may have resulted in at least one major omission from the treaty: Gallipoli itself remained in Ottoman hands, thereby averting the extremely disadvantageous position that had resulted from its temporary loss to the Savoyard crusade in 1366, when the Ottoman domains in Anatolia and Europe had been effectively sundered apart.

The historian Nevra Necipoğlu highlights the reference to the Byzantine emperor as "father" by Süleyman throughout the treaty, indicating the remarkable reversal of positions brought about by the Battle of Ankara: from tributary Ottoman vassals teetering at the verge of extinction, after Ankara the Byzantines gained a certain advantage over the Ottomans, and managed to retain it for several years through adroit use of diplomacy and switching support between the rival Ottoman princes. In 1411, Süleyman was overthrown and killed by his brother, Musa, who proceeded to capture most of the territories ceded to the Byzantines in Macedonia, Thessaly, and Thrace. However, after Musa was defeated by Mehmed I in 1413, bringing an end to the Ottoman civil war the new Sultan confirmed anew the provisions of the treaty of Gallipoli, and his position as "obedient son" of Emperor Manuel, and upheld them until his death in 1421.

Following the rise of Murad II to the throne, and Manuel's attempt to put on the throne a pretender to replace Murad, even if Murad was from all accounts ready to respect the treaty of 1403, the friendly Byzantine–Ottoman relations ended: Murad launched a brief siege of Constantinople in 1422, and began a long blockade of Thessalonica, which forced the Byzantines to hand it over to Venice in 1423. In a peace treaty concluded in February 1424, the Byzantines lost again most of the territories gained at Gallipoli, and were once more reduced to the status of tributary vassals.

On the Venetian side, following Süleyman's preoccupation with affairs in Anatolia from 1406 on, relations worsened, as the local frontier warlords were left free to act, while Venice too became entangled in a war of expansion against the local Christian ruler Balša III, an Ottoman vassal, in the western Balkans. Venice sent repeated embassies to Süleyman in 1406–1409 to little avail. During this period, the Venetians negotiated directly with Pasha Yiğit Bey, ruler of Skopje, as well as with Süleyman. Nevertheless, the Venetian ambassador Francesco Giustinian managed to conclude a treaty with Süleyman in 1409, and following the latter's downfall, a similar treaty, the Treaty of Selymbria, was concluded with Musa in September 1411.

== Sources ==
- Bakalopulos, A. (1962). "Les limites de l'empire byzantin depuis la fin du XIV' siècle jusqu'à sa chute (1453)". Byzantinische Zeitschrift (in French). 55 (1): 56–65. doi:10.1515/byzs.1962.55.1.56.
- Dennis, George T. (1967). "The Byzantine–Turkish Treaty of 1403". Orientalia Christiana Periodica. XXXIII: 72–88.
- Foss, Clive (1996). Survey of Medieval Castles of Anatolia, Vol. II: Nicomedia. London: British Institute of Archaeology at Ankara. ISBN 978-1-8982-4907-8.
- Kastritsis, Dimitris (2007). The Sons of Bayezid: Empire Building and Representation in the Ottoman Civil War of 1402-13. BRILL. ISBN 978-90-04-15836-8.
- Magoulias, Harry, ed. (1975). Decline and Fall of Byzantium to the Ottoman Turks, by Doukas. An Annotated Translation of "Historia Turco-Byzantina" by Harry J. Magoulias, Wayne State University. Detroit: Wayne State University Press. ISBN 0-8143-1540-2.
- Miller, William (1908). The Latins in the Levant: A History of Frankish Greece (1204–1566). London: John Murray.
- Necipoğlu, Nevra (2009). Byzantium between the Ottomans and the Latins: Politics and Society in the Late Empire. Cambridge: Cambridge University Press. ISBN 978-1-107-40388-8.
- Setton, Kenneth M. (1976). The Papacy and the Levant (1204–1571), Volume I: The Thirteenth and Fourteenth Centuries. Vol. 1. Philadelphia: The American Philosophical Society. ISBN 0-87169-114-0.
- Shukurov, Rustam (2016). The Byzantine Turks (1204–1461). Leiden: Brill. ISBN 978-90-04-30512-0.
