= Church of St Peter, St Paul and St John, Llantrisant =

- Church of St Peter, St Paul and St John
- Church of St Peter, St Paul and St John, Llantrisant
- 51.6678°N 2.8817°W
- Location: Llantrisant, Monmouthshire
- Country: Wales
- Denomination: Church in Wales

History
- Status: Grade I listed

Architecture
- Style: Decorated
- Years built: 13th century

Administration
- Diocese: Monmouth
- Archdeaconry: Monmouth
- Deanery: Heart of Monmouthshire Deanery
- Benefice: Heart of Monmouthshire Ministry Area
- Parish: Heart of Monmouthshire Ministry Area (current), Llantrisant Fawr (ancient)

Clergy
- Priest: Reverend S L Ingle-Gillis

The Church of St Peter, St Paul and St John, is the parish church of Llantrisant, Monmouthshire, Wales. Described by the architectural historian, John Newman as "a handsome church" in the Decorated style, it has been a Grade I listed building since 18 November 1980.

== History and architecture ==
The church is known from documentation of the 12th century, when Bishop Nicholas of Llandaff arbitrated the rights of its Welsh rector, Robert ab Eli, who also had held the churches of Llanllywel and Llangybi since the time of Bishop Urban (1107-34). The confirmed grants indicate that Llantrisant was at the time a collegiate or clas church with a district encompassing the middle Usk valley. The present church is fourteenth century in origin but nothing remains of this period beyond a single lancet window in the nave. The remainder is of the fifteenth and sixteenth centuries, and of the restoration by E. A. Landsdowne in 1880–81.

== Gallery ==
Churchyard cross

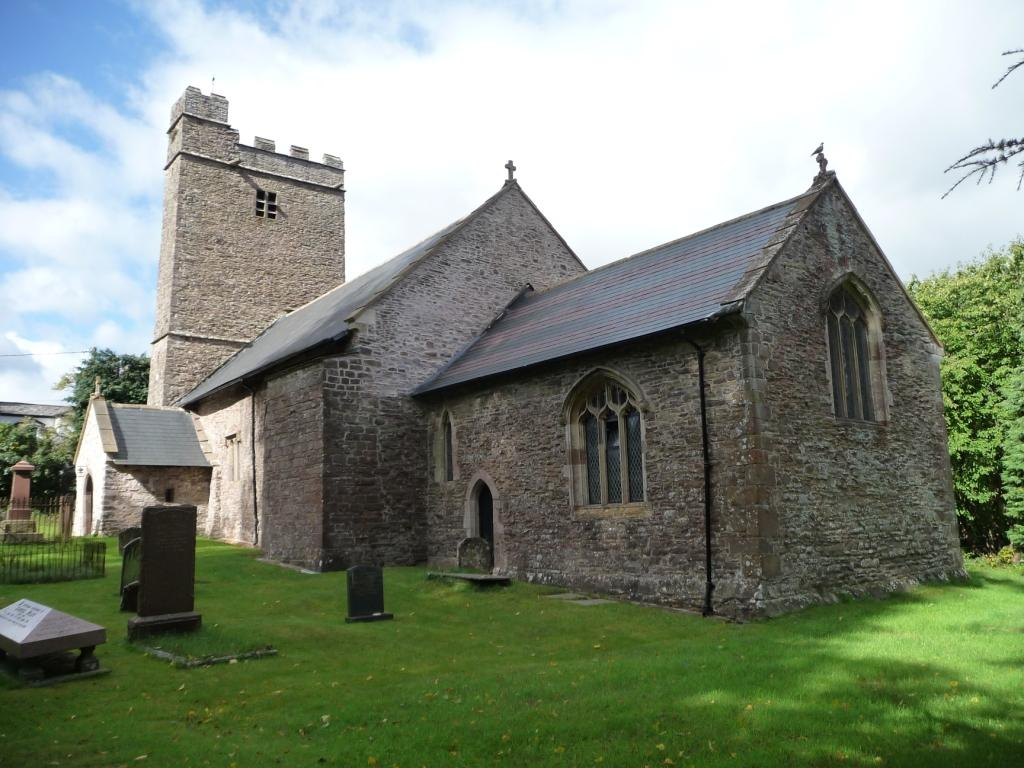
Church from the East

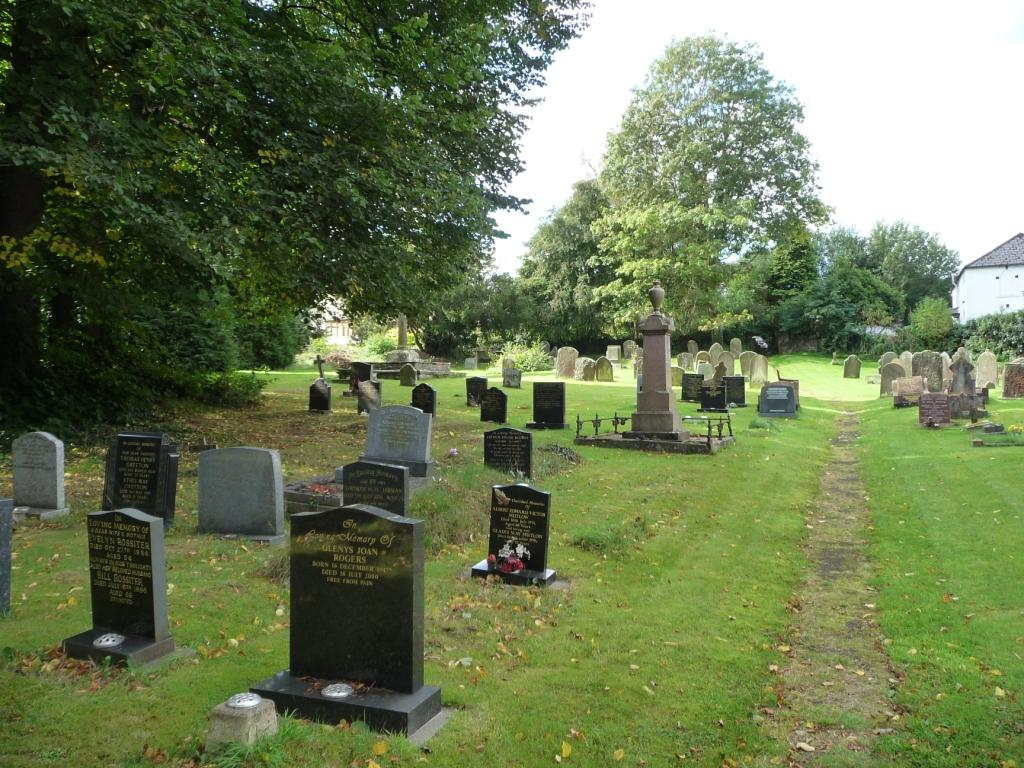
Path through the churchyard

Church from the South
