= San Pietro di Feletto =

- Comune
- Comune di San Pietro di Feletto
- Coat of arms

- Location within Italy Location within Veneto
- Coordinates: 45°56′N 12°15′E
- Country: Italy
- Region: Veneto
- Province: Treviso (TV)

Government
  - Mayor: Loris Dalto

Area
  - Total: 19.5 km^{2} (7.5 sq mi)

Population (Dec. 2004)
  - Total: 5,144
  - Density: 264/km^{2} (683/sq mi)
- Time zone: UTC+1 (CET)
  - Summer (DST): UTC+2 (CEST)
- Postal code: 31020
- Dialing code: 0438

San Pietro di Feletto is a comune (municipality) in the Province of Treviso in the Italian region Veneto, located about 60 kilometres (37 mi) north of Venice and about 50 kilometres (31 mi) north of Treviso.

== Main sights ==
The Pieve (Pleban church) of San Pietro, dating to the 11th century and perhaps built over the ruins of a Pagan temple, has a medieval portal under which are five frescoes of St. Antony Abbot, Virgin with Child, Virgin with Saints, Sacrifice of Cain and Abel and Sunday Christ. The interior, with a nave and two aisles, has frescoes from the 12th-15th centuries. The apse features a Christ Pantocrator between the Virgin and St. Peter dating to the 13th century.
