= Llanddyfrwyr-yn-Edeligion =

Former village in Monmouthshire, Wales

Llanddyfrwyr-yn-Edeligion was a village in Monmouthshire, Wales. In the early dark ages it was associated with King Glywys, his son Edelig after whom the village is named, and Saint Cybi. It is now part of the parish and community of Llangybi.
