= St Cybi's Church =

Coordinates: 53.3118°N 4.6328°W

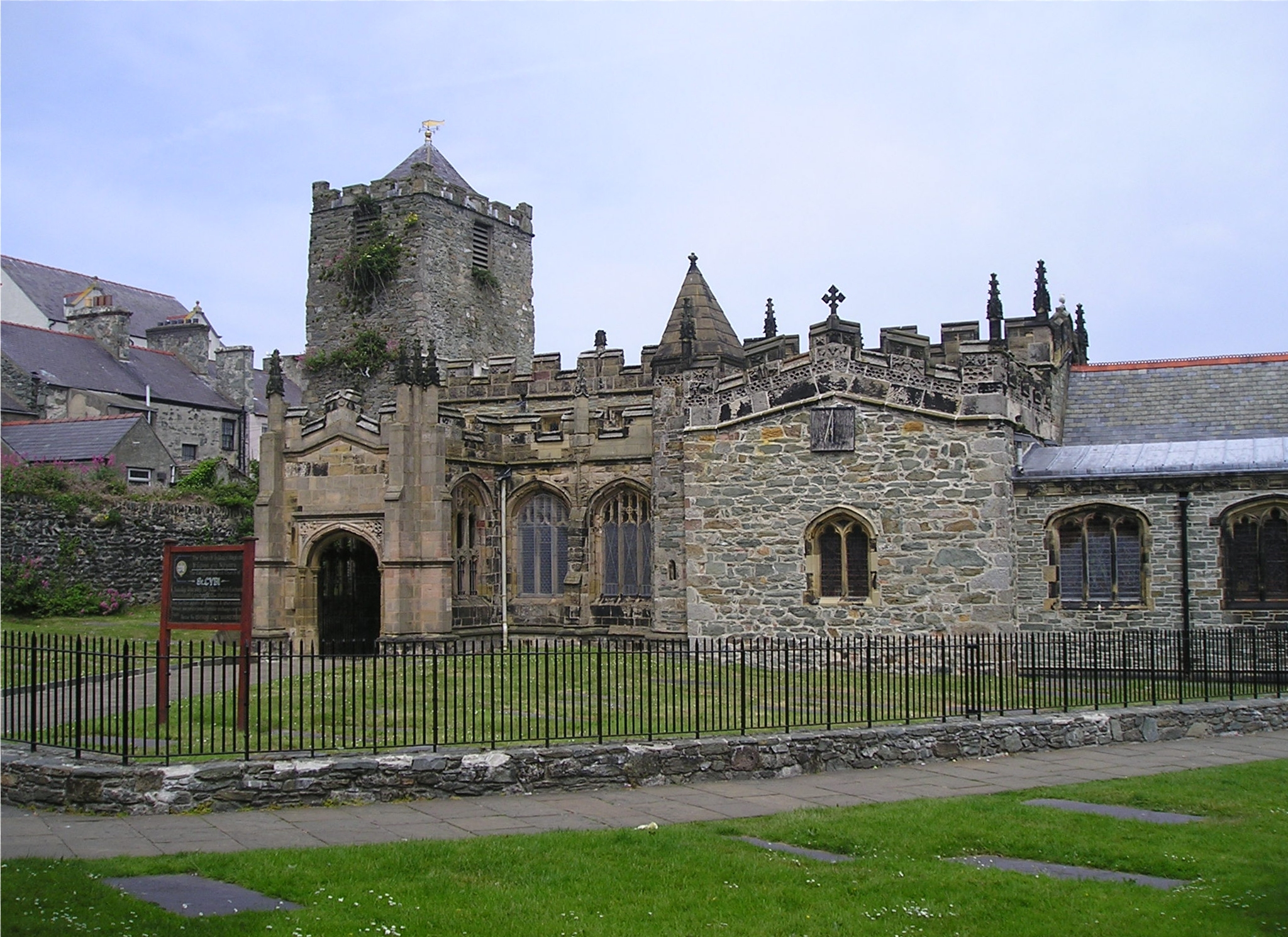
- The south face view of the church

- Location in Anglesey
- Location: Caer Gybi, Anglesey
- Country: Wales
- Denomination: Church in Wales

History
- Founded: 13th century

Architecture
- Heritage designation: Grade I
- Architectural type: Church
- Style: Medieval

St Cybi's Church is a medieval church near the Roman Caer Gybi in Holyhead, Anglesey, Wales. The church was Grade I listed in January 1968. The original church was constructed at Holyhead around 540 AD by St Cybi, a cousin of St David. The church was sacked by Viking invaders in the 10th century and damaged again in 1405 by Henry IV's invading forces. The present church was built in the 13th century and stands near the Roman Caer Gybi fort in Holyhead.

== History ==
The church was built on the site of the abandoned Roman fort Caer Gybi which was built between the 3rd and 4th-centuries. During the 6th-century, King Maelgwn Gwynedd gave the fort to St Cybi, a cousin of Saint David, who used it to begin an early Christian monastic settlement within the ruined fort walls in 540. After St Cybi's death on 8 November 555, he was buried in the churchyard, and the Eglwys y Bedd church is thought to mark his original burial place.

In the 10th century, the original church was sacked by Viking raiders. In 1405, it was further damaged by Henry IV's troops, who invaded Anglesey from Ireland as part of Henry's efforts to put down Owain Glyndŵr's rebellion. The English army stole Cybi's shrine and relics and placed them in Christ Church Cathedral in Dublin. After they were taken, pilgrimages to St Cybi's ceased.

In the 1650s during the English Civil War, Oliver Cromwell's army was garrisoned at the church. While they were there, they damaged the church fixtures and defaced the statues in the church, as well as the font, memorials, and stained glass windows. The soldiers also increased the church's tower by 17-foot (5.2 m) so they could use it as a lookout point over the coast.

== Architecture ==
The present church of St Cybi's was built between the 13th and 16th centuries and stands near the walls of the Roman Caer Gybi. The chancel is one of the oldest parts of the church, dating to the 13th century. In 1897, The Stanley chapel designed by British architect Sir Gilbert Scott was added to the south of the church for local politician William Owen Stanley and contains a life-size Carrera marble sculpture of Stanley by Hamo Thornycroft. A sun dial with the inscription "Yr hoedl ar hyd ei haros a dderfydd yn nydd ac yn nos", which translates to "Life though long it stay will end in night and day", is located on the south transept. Ornamental figures are located throughout the church, both inside and out.

In 2012, the National Lottery Heritage Fund granted the church £4800 to restore the church tower.
