= Journey of Manuel II to Western Europe =

Byzantine Emperor's journey (1399 to 1403)

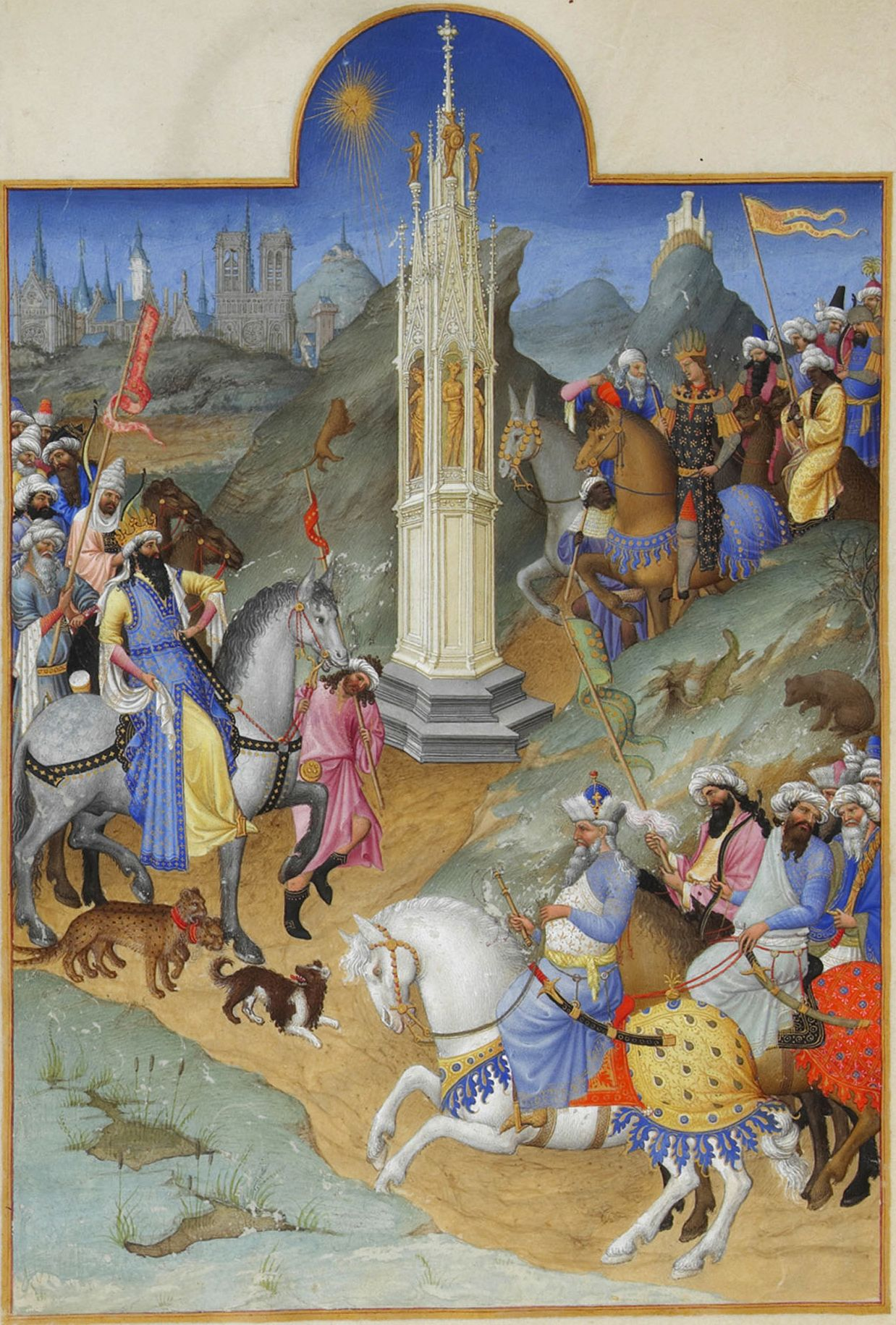
- Depiction of Manuel II (with a white horse) entering Paris in Les Très Riches Heures du duc de Berry.
- Leader: Manuel II Palaiologos
- Start: Constantinople; December 10, 1399
- End: Constantinople; 1403
- Goal: Obtaining military support for the Byzantine Empire

Between 1399 and 1403, the Byzantine Emperor, Manuel II, undertook a journey to Western Europe to obtain military support from Western powers. Promoted and aided by his friend, Jean II Le Maingre (known as "Boucicaut"), Manuel II visited various Western courts starting in Italy, and then moving to France and later England. He stayed in Paris for some time and received promises of aid, as he did in other European capitals, which ultimately did not materialize.

The news of the defeat of Bayezid, the greatest threat to the Byzantine Empire, at the hands of Timur at the Battle of Ankara, ultimately made his journey unnecessary, and Manuel II returned to Constantinople in 1403. Although Manuel II obtained a reprieve for the survival of his Empire, the journey already foreshadowed the scant Western support for his cause, which would be again demonstrated during the Fall of Constantinople in 1453, as Western Europe turned away from the East.

== History ==
=== Background ===
The city of Constantinople underwent a protracted siege starting from 1394. Various attempts at support failed, such as during the Battle of Nicopolis, where Ottoman forces crushed the coalition led by the King of Hungary, Sigismund of Luxembourg. During these efforts, Jean II Le Maingre, known as "Boucicaut", welcomed as a hero by the population, managed, with a small contingent of French troops, to slightly alleviate the pressure on the city. After briefly considering giving the throne of the Byzantine Empire to Charles VI, Boucicaut and Manuel II decided to embark on a diplomatic journey to Western courts, so that Manuel II could obtain the military support necessary for the survival of his Empire.

=== Travel ===
==== Peloponnese and Italy ====
Boucicaut and Manuel boarded Venetian galleys on 10 December 1399. They first traveled to the Peloponnese, specifically to Mistra. There, Manuel could entrust Empress Irene, his wife, and their children to his brother, the Despot of the Morea Theodore I Palaiologos. They then set sail for Venice, where the Emperor was received by the Doge aboard the Bucentaur. While Manuel addressed the Great Council of Venice, Boucicaut headed to Paris to organize the Emperor’s reception. Pleased with the Venetian promises, Manuel proceeded to Padua, where he was welcomed with great pomp by the sons of Francesco da Carrara. He entered the city at one in the morning through the All Saints' Gate. After Padua, Manuel reached Vicenza, but no details of this stop survive.

Finally, the Emperor met the Duke of Milan, Gian Galeazzo Visconti, in Pavia. Visconti organized a lavish reception in his honor and promised that as soon as other sovereigns came to his aid, he would join the war effort and personally lead troops to Constantinople. Additionally, Visconti provided an escort for Manuel to cross the Alps and head towards Paris, where he was to meet the King of France, Charles VI.

==== France and England ====
After traveling through Italy, Manuel took the road to Paris, following a route that remains unknown. Regarding his visit, the Anonymous of Saint Denis stated:

"The king had long awaited the arrival of monseigneur Manuel, Emperor of Greece. He was delighted to learn that the illustrious sovereign of such a renowned empire had arrived in his domains. This extraordinary event seemed very honorable and glorious for his reign, and he proudly reflected that none of his predecessors had received such a precious sign of favor from heaven. He therefore resolved to receive the emperor with all kinds of honors and sent noble knights to meet him, to ensure a reception worthy of the imperial majesty in the cities and other places he was to pass through, and to see that he was properly lodged. He also decided, with the advice of the principal lords, that his entry into Paris should be made with all the pomp that the honor of France required."

He was welcomed with great honors by Charles VI at Charenton-le-Pont in a friendly ceremony where both dismounted from their horses to exchange a kiss of peace. Charles VI spared no expense, organizing a majestic ceremony to welcome his guest, which included two thousand Parisian bourgeois who formed a procession in front of the group. They then proceeded to the Louvre where they celebrated their meeting. Despite the madness that had afflicted him since the Bal des Ardents in 1393, Charles VI had a long interval of lucidity and spent time with his visitor, notably showing him the monasteries and churches of the capital. The medieval chronicler Juvénal des Ursins recorded that the emperor was accompanied by Orthodox clergy, who conducted services in Paris. Regarding the liturgy celebrated in Paris, he stated: "The religious service was conducted according to their customs, which were very curious, and everyone could attend". He attended the wedding of Marie de Berry and John I of Bourbon, and was placed between the king and the officiating cardinal at the banquet that followed, further demonstrating the king's affection. Moreover, he promised to intervene as soon as possible and to promptly send troops to Manuel's aid. In this situation, Manuel wrote to his friend Chrysoloras:

"Finally, we are in France, and our hand moves on its own, striving to write to you what ought to be conveyed in person; for it far exceeds the limits of a letter. Numerous are the gifts that the glorious king has granted us, numerous too are those we have received from his relatives, the dignitaries of his court, and everyone else. They have shown the nobility of their spirit, their affection for us, and their steadfast zeal for the faith. In short, if the usual jealousy of misfortune does not send us some unforeseen blow, we have good hope of returning soon to our homeland, as you wish and as our enemies fear."

However, with Charles VI's madness returning, Manuel decided to continue his journey to England to meet Henry IV. After a journey about which little is known, he crossed the Channel, was welcomed by the Augustinians of Canterbury, and met Henry at Blackheath on St. Thomas's Day 1400, either 21 or 29 December of that year. Since Henry IV had just dethroned his cousin Richard II, he was all the more amicable towards Manuel, who brought significant legitimacy to his reign. Although few details are known about this episode, it appears he promised Manuel troops and aid, as evidenced by another letter to Chrysoloras:

"The prince with whom we are now, the King of Great Britain, this land that could be called another world, a prince inundated with wealth, adorned with a thousand qualities, has followed his natural instinct by becoming for us a harbor after a double storm: of nature and of fortune. His conversation is full of charm; he delights us in every way, honors us, and loves us equally. He grants us assistance in men-at-arms, archers, money, and ships, which will transport the army wherever needed."

After his stay in England, Manuel returned to Paris, where the situation had worsened due to the recurrence of Charles VI's madness, rendering him incapable of ruling. Manuel remained at the court for two years, occupying himself as best he could, notably by engaging in theological debates on the Filioque at the University of Paris. To argue against the Filioque, he composed a text of one hundred and fifty-seven chapters, which has not been translated, in which he also attacked the primacy of the pope. Additionally, Manuel appreciated French art, mentioning a tapestry he saw at the Louvre in one of his letters. It is also possible that his presence in Paris inspired French art of the time, particularly influencing medallists and especially the Limbourg brothers, who seem to reference Manuel II and his entry into Paris in their depiction of the Magi in Les Très Riches Heures du duc de Berry, a major work of European art.

==== Return ====
Manuel gradually realized that the Western powers, who professed their intention to support him, were entangled in their own interests and conflicts, preventing them from intervening or making their promises empty. While he awaited the help that never came, news of the Battle of Ankara reached him from Constantinople. In this battle, the Turco-Mongol conqueror Timur crushed the Ottoman forces and captured the Ottoman Sultan, Bayezid, who had hastily lifted the siege of Constantinople to confront him. The Timurid victory provided a brief respite for the Byzantine Empire, rendering Manuel's presence in Western Europe unnecessary, especially as the promises of aid were not materializing. Consequently, he began his journey back, passing through Genoa and receiving assistance from Charles VI and the Doge of Venice, who were pleased to avoid deeper involvement. Manuel returned to the Peloponnese, where he reunited with his family, and then went back to Constantinople in 1403.
