= St Cybi's Church, Llangybi, Monmouthshire =

Coordinates: 51.6655°N 2.9064°W

- Church of St Cybi
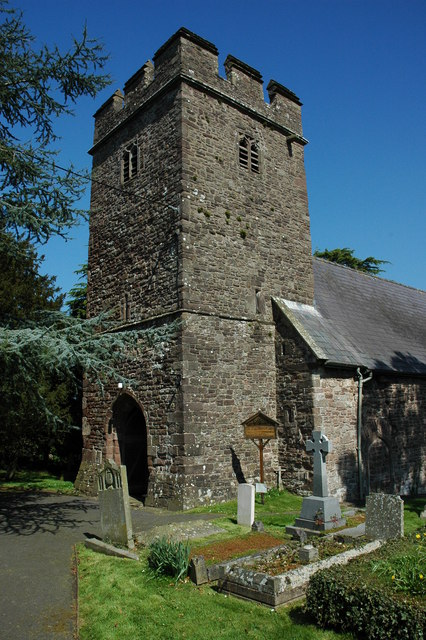
- The entrance and tower

- Location in Monmouthshire
- Location: Llangybi, Monmouthshire
- Country: Wales
- Denomination: Church in Wales

History
- Status: Parish church
- Founded: C13th-C14th century

Architecture
- Functional status: Active
- Heritage designation: Grade II*
- Designated: 18 November 1980
- Architectural type: Church

Administration
- Diocese: Monmouth
- Archdeaconry: Monmouth
- Deanery: Raglan/Usk
- Parish: Heart of Monmouthshire Ministry Area

Clergy
- Rector: Rev’d Canon Sally Ingle-Gillis

The Church of St Cybi, Llangybi, Monmouthshire is a parish church with its origins in the 13th or 14th century. Refurbished in the 15th century, the church was restored in 1909–10. The interior has a notable collection of medieval wall paintings, in particular a Christ of the Trades, dating from c.1460. The church is an active parish church and part of the recently formed Heart of Monmouthshire Ministry Area. It is a Grade II* listed building and the architectural writer John Newman, recording the church in the Buildings of Wales series, described it as "one of the most interesting in the Usk Valley."

== History ==
The church is dedicated to St Cybi, a 6th-century Cornish saint who is reputed to have founded the church. The present church dates from either the 13th or the 14th century. The church was refurbished in the early 18th century and then restored in the early 20th century by W H Dashwood Caple. The wall paintings are medieval and include The Creed and a depiction of Christ of the Trades. Whitewashed over for centuries, they are now fully restored, as part of an extensive restoration of the church.

Adam of Usk, the 15th-century priest and chronicler, was the incumbent of the parish in 1423.

The churchyard is the site of the grave of the victims of a Spanish sailor, Josef Garcia, who was convicted and hanged for the murder of five members of the Watkins family, resident in the village, in a notorious 19th century murder case.

Just outside the churchyard, are the remains of a Holy well, also dedicated to St Cybi. Recent scholarship suggests that the well, and the White Hart Inn in the village, were referenced by T.S. Eliot in his poem Usk. The relevant lines read:

"Do not suddenly break the branch, or
Hope to find
The white hart behind the white well."

== Architecture and description ==
The style of the building is Perpendicular. The West Tower is two-storeyed and without buttresses. The medieval roof of the nave has been exposed during current renovations. Simon Jenkins described the early 20th century restoration of the interior as "masterly" and attributes it to W. D. Caröe. In addition to the medieval wall painting, the interior has a number of 17th century painted inscriptions. It also has some funerary monuments, including one dedicated to John Morgan, and dated 1805, by Tyley of Bristol. The monument depicts a woman crying over an urn under a spreading weeping willow. Opinions differ as to its quality; the Cadw record describes it as "good", while Newman considers it "hackneyed." Newman takes a more positive view of the church overall, considering it "one of the most interesting in the Usk Valley". The pulpit is a reconstructed example from the 18th century, with an associated sounding board to amplify the preacher's voice. The pews are of the 19th century, and the now-refurbished organ dates from 1933.
