= Eglwys y Bedd =

Former church in Holyhead, Anglesey, Wales

Coordinates: 53.311428°N 4.632386°W

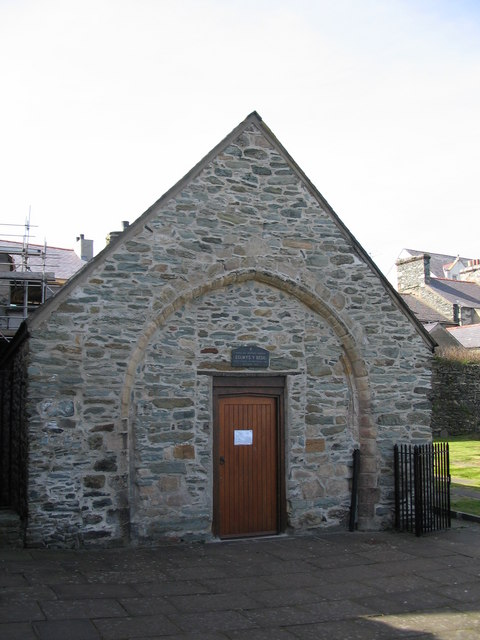
- The entrance to Eglwys y Bedd, through what was once the chancel arch

- Location in Anglesey
- Location: Holyhead, Anglesey
- Country: Wales
- Website: St Cybi's Church website

History
- Founded: 14th century

Architecture
- Heritage designation: Grade II
- Designated: 26 September 1951

Eglwys y Bedd ("Church of the grave") (sometimes referred to as Llan y Gwyddel, or "Church of the Irishman") is all that remains of a 14th-century church in Anglesey, north Wales. It is set within the churchyard of St Cybi's, Holyhead, and may have been built on the site where Cybi (a 6th-century Celtic saint who settled in Holyhead) lived and ministered. It is reputed to house the grave of Seregri, an Irish warrior who lived in the area in the 5th century.

It is a Grade II listed building, a national designation given to "buildings of special interest, which warrant every effort being made to preserve them". It housed the first school in Holyhead in the 18th century and is now used by St Cybi's church.

== History and location ==
Eglwys y Bedd is a medieval building in the south-west corner of the churchyard of St Cybi's, Holyhead (the principal port in Anglesey, north Wales). Cybi was a 6th-century Celtic saint who settled in Holyhead (which in Welsh is called Caergybi – "the fort of Cybi") Eglwys y Bedd may mark the original location of Cybi's cell (the place where he lived and ministered), and is located within the walls of the Roman fort that became Caer Gybi.

Archeological excavations in 1992 indicated that there had previously been another medieval building on this site. The present building dates from the early 14th century, although it was once larger than it is now: the present structure is only the nave of a larger church, the rest of which no longer exists. It was in ruins before 1748, when Thomas Ellis, the rector of St Cybi's, restored the nave for use as the first school in Holyhead. The chancel ruins were removed completely in 1810. Eglwys y Bedd is now used as a church room by St Cybi's, after restoration in 1980.

Seregri, a 5th-century Irishman, is reputed to be buried here. He was the leader of a group of Irish warriors who had settled on Anglesey and who were driven out by the Welsh ruler Cadwallon Lawhir ap Einion. The antiquarian Angharad Llwyd, writing in 1833, reported that when the ruins of Eglwys y Bedd were removed, a stone coffin "containing human bones of a prodigious size" was found at the north side of the chapel where Seregri was reportedly buried.

== Architecture ==
Eglwys y Bedd measures 26 feet 9 inches by 14 feet 6 inches (8.15 by 4.42 m). It is built with grey stones and has a slate roof. The west end of the building has a window, dated to the 14th century, above a blocked 15th- or 16th-century doorway. The chancel arch at the east end is surrounded by decorative work from the 14th century. The north side has two square windows.

== Assessment ==
The building has national recognition and statutory protection from unauthorised alteration as it has been designated as a Grade II listed building – the lowest of the three grades of listing, designating "buildings of special interest, which warrant every effort being made to preserve them". It was given this status on 26 September 1951.
