= Sunday Christ =

Motif in Christian art

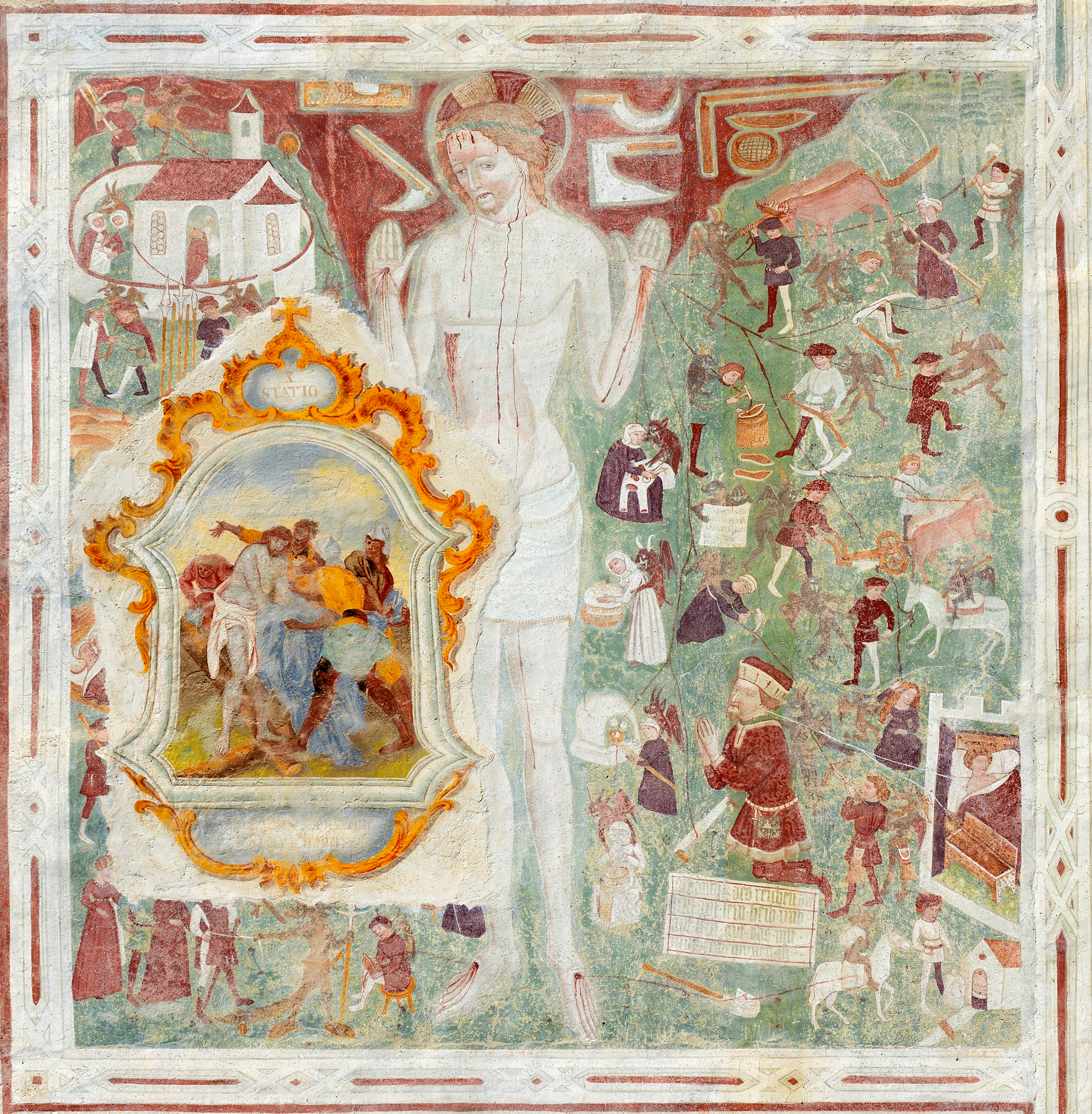
A 1450 fresco on the Saint James church in Urtijëi in northern Italy.

The Sunday Christ (formerly, St Sunday) is a gigantic figure in mediaeval church wall painting, intended to discourage sabbath-breaking and blasphemy. It is not known in stained glass or manuscripts. The Sunday Christ is also known as 'Feiertagschristus' in German, 'Christ du Dimanche' in French, and 'Cristo della domenica' in Italian.

These painted images, dating from the mid-fourteenth to the mid-sixteenth century, occur in clusters in two geographically distinct areas, namely southern England and Wales, and the Alpine regions of France, Germany, Austria, Switzerland, Slovenia and northern Italy. Some isolated examples also appear in Bohemia and on the Baltic coast. The fresco in the church in San Pietro di Feletto in north east Italy is a particularly fine example. A very good surviving English example is in Breage, Cornwall, with another in St Just in Penwith nearby. Yet another fine English example is to be found in Hessett church in Suffolk. An example from Wales can be found at St Cybi's Church, Llangybi, Monmouthshire.

All these figures show Christ as a central Man of Sorrows surrounded by objects, often the tools of various trades, such as axes, knives, scissors, mill-wheels, or a pair of scales, all of which are wounding Christ afresh. Objects with blades or sharp points have these pointing towards Christ, and blood can be seen dripping or even spurting in jets from fresh wounds caused by these. This fresh suffering of Christ has strong echoes of the Song of the Suffering Servant in Isaiah 53. Over time, these images might have been venerated as "Saint Sunday". There are 38 wills, as well as the Morebath churchwarden accounts that set aside provisions for a light to be set before the image of St. Sunday.

The appearance of these depictions is thought to have followed the Black Death, which peaked in Europe 1348–1350. In the aftermath of the plague, many more Days of Obligation were declared by the church. These were days when all people were supposed to go to Mass, and to abstain from those works and affairs which hinder the worship to be rendered to God. But for many tradespeople, the sheer number of such days meant that they had to work during them to be able to make a living. These depictions of Christ were intended to give a vivid warning to those who worked on days of obligation that they were re-crucifying Christ by their actions.

In medieval times, catechetical wall paintings were used to illustrate various teachings of the Catholic church. Many were simply artistic representations of stories, and others were simplifications of theological ideas – the Seven deadly sins and the Seven cardinal virtues, for example. Some warn against various occasions of sin, such as the Sabbath Breaking implicit in working on a Day of Obligation. Generally, wall paintings provided a local site for discussion and exemplification.

In Victorian times, these graphic images were reinterpreted, often referred to as Christ of the Trades, and were described as showing Christ blessing the tools of various trades. However, the way that Christ always has fresh wounds associated with some of the tools is at odds with such an interpretation.
