= Upper Dyffryn House, Grosmont =

Upper Dyffryn House
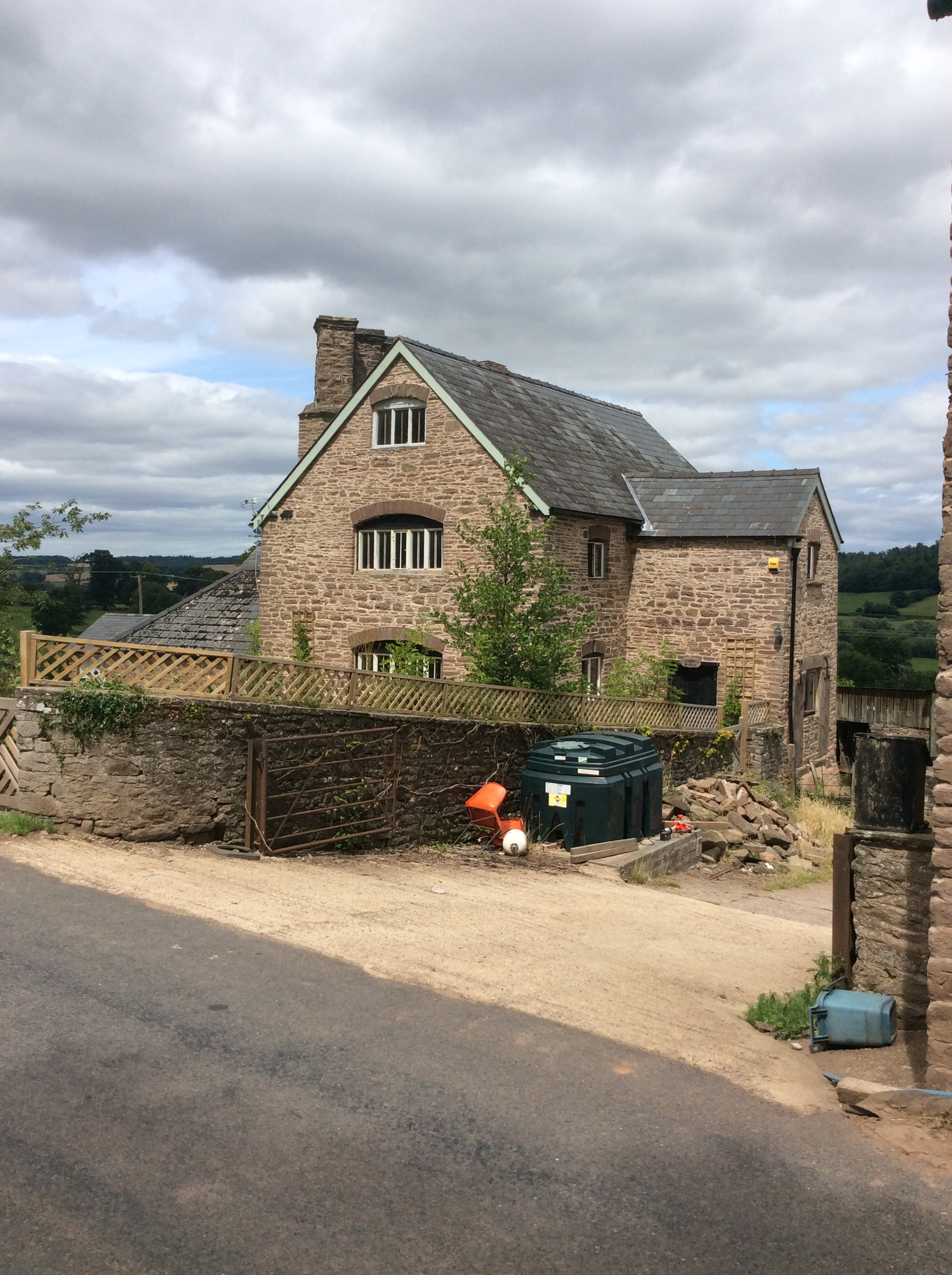
- "a fine early 17th century Renaissance farmhouse"

- Location within Monmouthshire
- 51.9062°N 2.8418°W
- Type: House
- Location: Grosmont Monmouthshire

History
- Built: 1692

Site notes
- Architectural style: Vernacular
- Governing body: Privately owned

Listed Building – Grade II*
- Official name: Upper Dyffryn House
- Designated: 6 May 1952
- Reference no.: 1922

Listed Building – Grade II*
- Official name: Former Detached Kitchen and Dairy at Upper Dyffryn
- Designated: 19 October 2000
- Reference no.: 24150

Upper Dyffryn House, Grosmont, Monmouthshire is a farmhouse dating from the early 17th century. It was built by John Gainsford, Sheriff of Monmouthshire in 1604. The farmhouse is Grade II* listed as are the dairy and kitchen which stand a little way from the main building.

== History and description ==
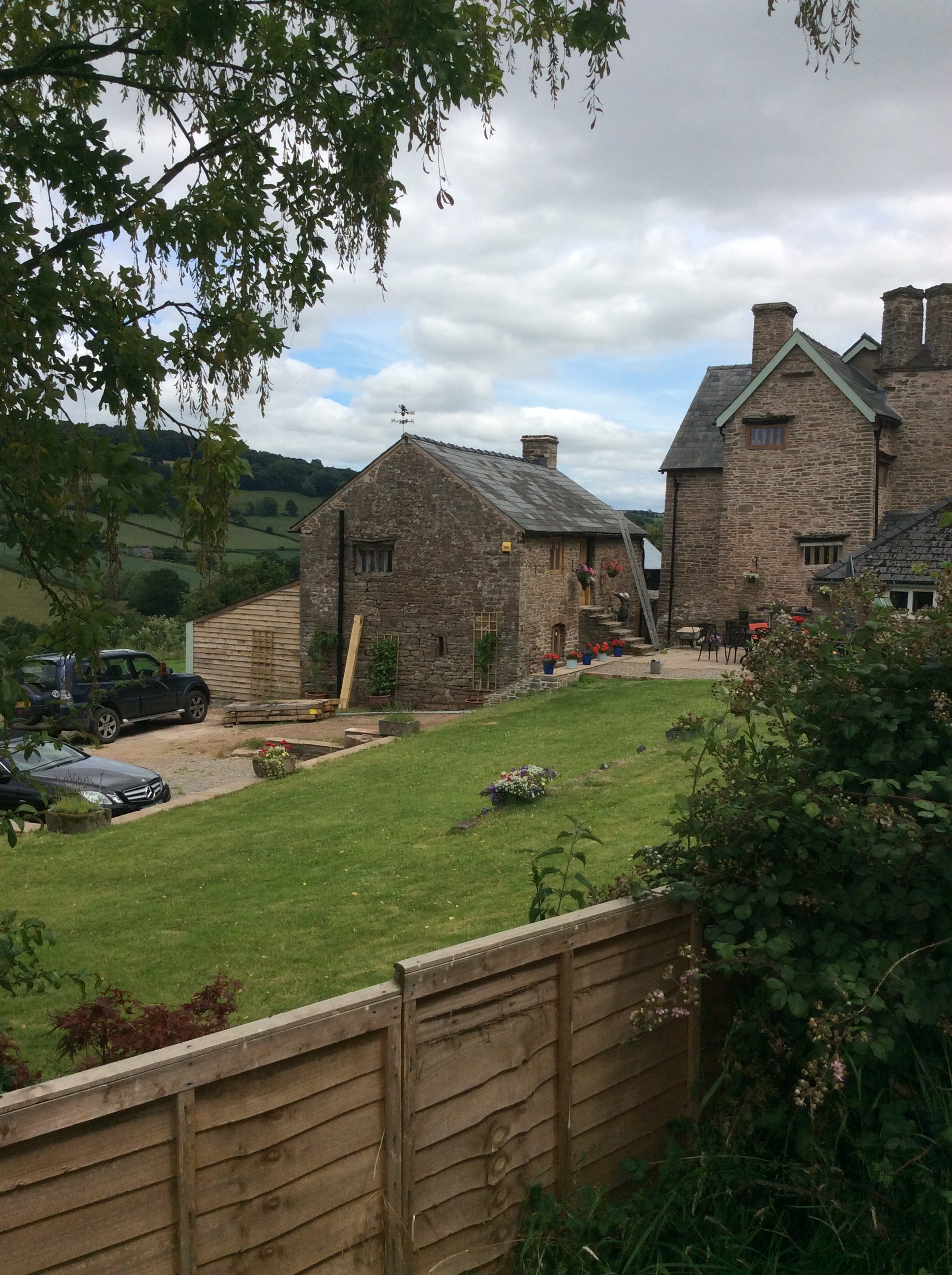
The detached kitchen and dairy at Upper Dyffryn

The farmhouse was constructed in the very early 17th century, Cadw recording that the builder was almost certainly John Gainsford, who served as Sheriff in 1604. Both the exterior and the interior have been little altered subsequently. The kitchen and dairy, which comprise a separate building set a little away from the house may originally have been constructed as an independent dwelling. Its construction date is "probably contemporary" or slightly later than the farmhouse.

The architectural historian John Newman describes Upper Dyffryn as a "tall early 17th century farmhouse". It is two storeys high, with attics above, and constructed of Old Red Sandstone rubble. It has a stair turret and tall chimney stacks, representing "a considerable advance in layout". The dairy is also of two storeys and of rubble construction and has a "fine ovolo moulded doorway with ornate shaped door-head".

Both the farmhouse and the dairy remain in private ownership and have separate Grade II* listed building designations.
