= Siege of Constantinople (1394–1402) =

1394–1402 siege of Constantinople by the Ottoman Empire

Blockade of Constantinople
- Part of the Byzantine–Ottoman wars
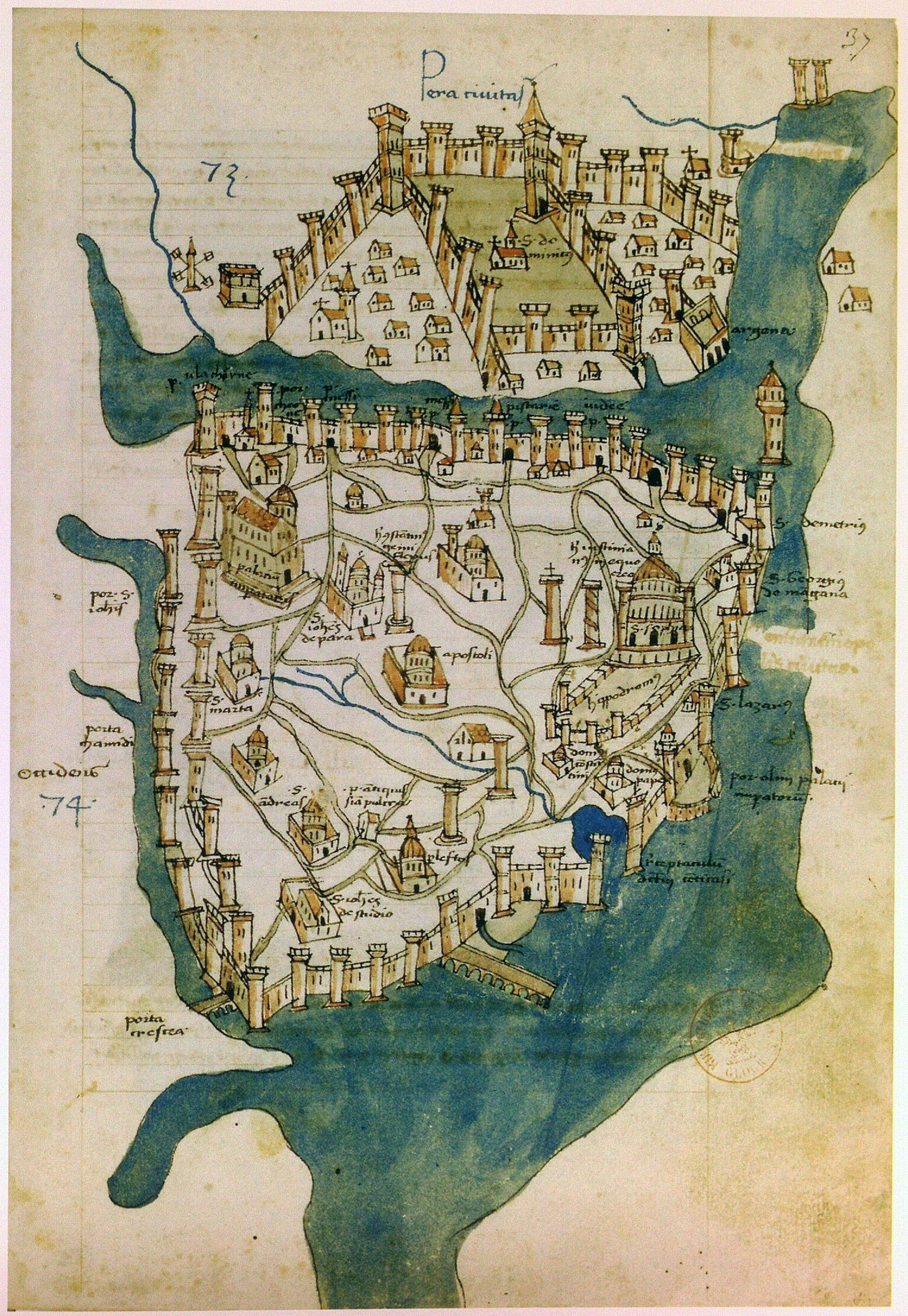
- Constantinople in 1422; the oldest surviving map of the city
Date	1394–1402
Location	Constantinople (modern-day Istanbul, Turkey) 41°00′44″N 28°58′34″E
Result	Byzantine victory

Belligerents
Byzantine Empire supported by: Kingdom of France	Ottoman Empire

Commanders and leaders
(Byzantine Empire) Manuel II Palaiologos (Byzantine Empire) John VII Palaiologos (Kingdom of France) Jean II Le Maingre	(Ottoman Empire) Bayezid I (Ottoman Empire) Ali Pasha
- Location within Mediterranean

The siege of Constantinople from 1394 to 1402 was a long blockade of the capital of the Byzantine Empire by the Ottoman sultan Bayezid I. Already in 1391, the rapid Ottoman conquests in the Balkans had cut off the city from its hinterland. After constructing the fortress of Anadoluhisarı to control the Bosporus strait, Bayezid tried to starve the city into submission by blockading it both by land and, less effectively, by sea.

The Crusade of Nicopolis was launched to relieve the city, but it was decisively defeated by the Ottomans. In 1399, a French expeditionary force under Marshal de Boucicaut arrived, but was unable to achieve much. The situation became so dire that in December 1399 the Byzantine emperor, Manuel II Palaiologos, left the city to tour the courts of Western Europe in a desperate attempt to secure military aid. The emperor was welcomed with honours, but secured no definite pledges of support. The city was relieved when Bayezid had to confront the invasion of Timur in 1402. Bayezid's defeat in the Battle of Ankara in 1402 and the subsequent Ottoman civil war enabled the Byzantines to regain some lost territories in the Treaty of Gallipoli.

== Sources ==
- Barker, John W. (1969). Manuel II Palaeologus (1391-1425): A Study in Late Byzantine Statesmanship. New Brunswick: Rutgers University Press. hdl:2027/heb.02900.0001.001. ISBN 9780813505824.
- Bernincolas-Hatzopoulos, Dionysios (1983). "The First Siege of Constantinople by the Ottomans (1394-1402) and its Repercussions on the Civilian Population of the City" (PDF). Études Byzantines. 10 (1): 39–51.
- Brandejs, Jan (2015). "The Russian Aid to Byzantium during the Turkish Siege of Constantinople, 1394–1402" (PDF). Prague Papers on the History of International Relations (1): 7–16.
- Hadjopoulos, Dionysios (1980). Le premier siège de Constantinople par les Ottomans (1394-1402) (PhD thesis) (in French). University of Montreal.
- Necipoğlu, Nevra (2009). "The First Challenge: Bayezid I's Siege of Constantinople (1394–1402)". Byzantium between the Ottomans and the Latins: Politics and Society in the Late Empire. Cambridge: Cambridge University Press. pp. 149–183. ISBN 978-1-107-40388-8.
