= Cybi =

6th-century Cornish Catholic saint

Saint Cybi / Saint Cuby
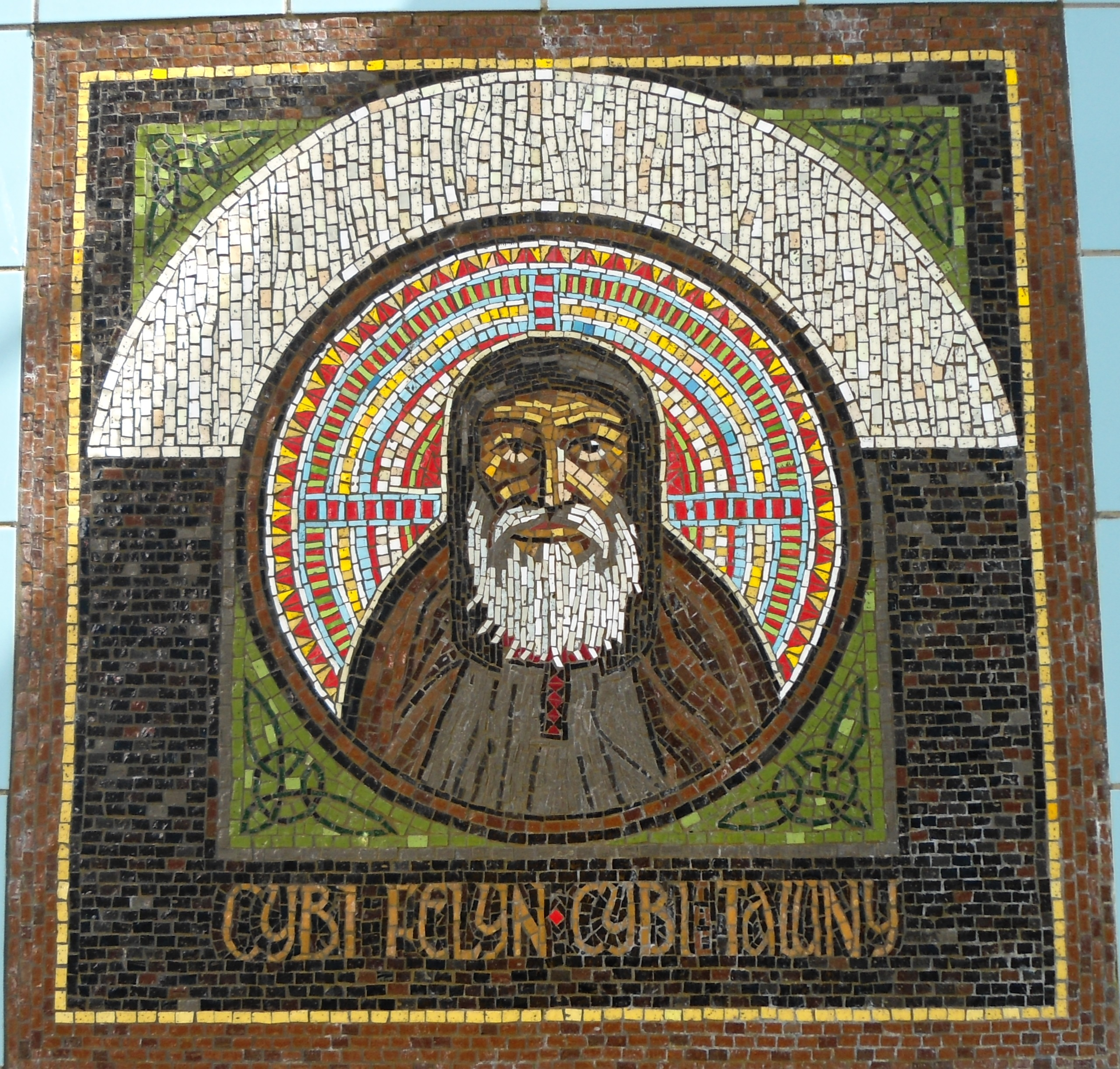
- Mural of Cybi in Holyhead, Anglesey by artist Gary Drostle

Abbot of Caer-Gybi
- Born: 483; Dumnonia (modern day Cornwall)
- Died: 8 November 555
- Venerated in: Catholic Church; Eastern Orthodoxy; Anglican Communion
- Canonized: Pre-Congregation
- Feast: 8 November; 13 August in Cornwall
- Patronage: Cuby, Cornwall; Landulph, Cornwall; Llangybi, Monmouthshire, Wales; Llangybi, Cardigan, Wales; Tregony, Cornwall; Kenwyn, Cornwall

Saint Cybi (Welsh), or Cuby (Cornish), was a 6th-century Cornish bishop, saint, and, briefly, king, who worked largely in Cornwall and North Wales: his biography is recorded in two slightly variant medieval vitae.

== Life in Cornwall ==
The vita of Cybi, found in two (Latin) forms written about 1200, is of very doubtful value, but may be right in making him the son of a Cornish noble who was princeps militae, at a court between the Tamar and the Lynher, possibly Gelliwig.

According to the 'Life of Saint Cybi', he was the son of Salomon, a 'warrior prince', generally thought to have been a King of Cornwall. In the 'Bonedd y Saint', his father's name is given the Welsh form, Selyf. His mother, Saint Wenna (Gwen ferch Cynyr), was sister to Saint Non.

He was raised as a Christian and, in early life, went on a pilgrimage to Byzantine Judea and Jerusalem. He was appalled at the Church in Israel and considered it an invader of Christ's land. In Judea, he found Jewish Christians and he became anointed by a Nazarene Christian who was a Jewish man descendant of Jesus's brothers. He arrived home to find that his father was dead and he was King of Cornwall. Cybi politely declined the throne and, instead, traveled through his kingdom, preaching to the people and building churches at Duloe, and Tregony.

== Life in Wales ==
Cybi then moved on to south Wales, founding churches at Llangybi between Usk and Caerleon in Monmouthshire, and Llanddyfrwyr-yn-Edeligion. According to legend, Cybi is supposed to have crossed the Bristol Channel with ten followers. The local duke, Edelig, son of Glywys, threatened to evict them from his land, but as he approached them he fell from his horse, which died, and he and his men became blind. Edelig then prostrated himself and gave his body and soul to God, and he and his attendants were immediately cured and the horse restored to life.

He eventually sailed for north Wales, settling at Llangybi on the Llŷn peninsula. Not far from the church is Ffynnon Gybi (English: St Cybi's Well), whose waters have long been believed to hold healing properties.

Off Anglesey, King Maelgwn Gwynedd gave him the old Roman fort at Holyhead (subsequently known, in Welsh, as Caer Gybi, "Cybi's Fort") on Holy Island (thence called Ynys Gybi, "Cybi's Island"). He founded a large and important monastery there in the area where St Cybi's Church is now located.

Cybi was a great friend of Saint Seiriol. He would always face the Sun while travelling to meet him and his resulting tanned complexion led to him being known as Cybi Felyn. This picturesque legend of the weekly meetings at Clorach in the midst of Anglesey is a bit of modern folk-lore, but the epithet may be ancient.

He is also said to have attended the Synod of Llanddewi Brefi in 560 in Ceredigion where he advised some pilgrims on their journey to Ynys Enlli (Bardsey). Rhyd-y-Saint railway station (English: Saints' Ford) on the Red Wharf Bay branch line near Pentraeth, was named so as Cybi and Seiriol are said to have met there.

Cybi died on 8 November 555 and was buried in Eglwys y Bedd (the Chapel of the Grave) adjoining his monastery at Holyhead.

== See also ==
- St Cuby's Church, Cuby
