= White Hart Inn, Llangybi =

White Hart Inn
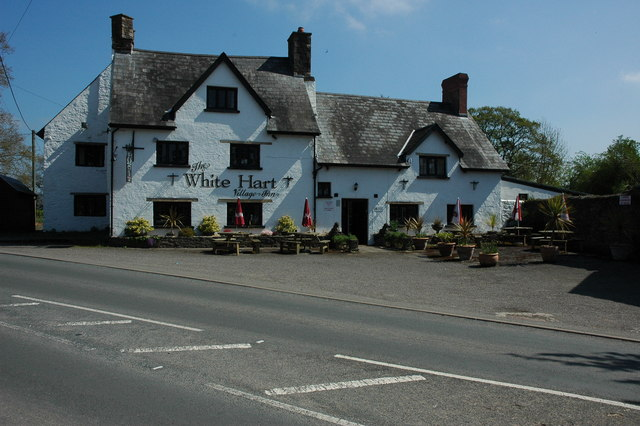
- "Conspicuous at the centre of the village"

- Location within Monmouthshire
- 51.6655°N 2.9073°W
- Type: House
- Location: Llangybi, Monmouthshire

History
- Built: c.1600-1650

Site notes
- Architectural style: Vernacular
- Governing body: Privately owned

Listed Building – Grade II*
- Official name: The White Hart Public House
- Designated: 4 March 1952
- Reference no.: 2688

The White Hart Inn, Llangybi, Monmouthshire is a public house dating from the early 17th century. Located at a crossroads in the centre of the village, it is a Grade II* listed building.

== History ==
The building was begun in the very late 16th century or early 17th centuries. Cadw suggests a building date as early as 1590, but the architectural writer John Newman, recording the inn in the Gwent/Monmouthshire volume of the Buildings of Wales series, favours an early 17th century date. In the mid-17th century it became the property of Henry VIII as part of Jane Seymour's wedding dowry. The inn is often said to have a priest hole, and to have been the headquarters of Oliver Cromwell during his campaigning in Monmouthshire in the English Civil War, but the main sources do not support these suggestions.

In 2003 Philip Edwards, former King Alfred professor of English literature at Liverpool University suggested that T. S. Eliot made cryptic reference to this pub and the village well in his 1935 poem "Usk". The relevant lines read:

"Do not suddenly break the branch, or
Hope to find
The white hart behind the white well."

== Architecture and description ==
Coflein describes the building as a double-house, although sources agree that it appears to have been a single dwelling from its earliest construction. The building is white-washed and of two storeys with a roof of Welsh slate. It is constructed to an L-plan. Newman notes the "fine array" of mullioned windows and the plaster ceiling in the upstairs parlour, decorated with "sunflowers and fleurs-de-lys".
