= Extraordinarius =

Scientific classification
- Kingdom: Animalia
- Phylum: Arthropoda
- Subphylum: Chelicerata
- Class: Arachnida
- Order: Araneae
- Infraorder: Araneomorphae
- Family: Sparassidae
- Genus: Extraordinarius; Rheims, 2019

Type species
- E. andrematosi Rheims, 2019

Species
- 6, see text

Genus of spiders

Extraordinarius is a genus of South American huntsman spiders. It was first described by C. A. Rheims in 2019, and it has only been found in Brazil.

All species so far described in this genus have been named after famous rock musicians.

== Species ==
As of May 2024 it contains six species:

- E. alicecooperi Rheims, 2022 – Brazil – named after Alice Cooper.
- E. andrematosi Rheims, 2019 (type) – Brazil – named after Andre Matos.
- E. angusyoungi Rheims, 2022 – Brazil – named after Angus Young.
- E. brucedickinsoni Rheims, 2019 – Brazil – named after Bruce Dickinson.
- E. klausmeinei Rheims, 2019 – Brazil – named after Klaus Meine.
- E. rickalleni Rheims, 2019 – Brazil – named after Rick Allen.

== See also ==
- List of organisms named after famous people
