= Llantrisant, Monmouthshire =

Coordinates: 51°40′04″N 2°52′53″W

Church of St Peter, St Paul and St John

Llantrisant (Welsh pronunciation) is a village in Monmouthshire, south east Wales, United Kingdom. The community population at the 2011 census was 475.

It is not to be confused with the much larger Llantrisant in Rhondda Cynon Taf.

== Location ==
Llantrisant is located about 3 miles (5 km) by road south of Usk, in the community of Llantrisant Fawr. The village is on the eastern bank of the River Usk, and the Usk Valley Walk long distance footpath passes through the village after descending from the Wentwood escarpment. The Llantrisant Brook, a small tributary of the River Usk, passes through the village, and the village is by-passed by the A449 road.

== History and amenities ==
The name of the village translates as the Parish of the Three Saints, and the parish church is the Church of St Peter, St Paul and St John. The church is 14th century in origin, but nothing remains of that period beyond a lancet window. The remainder is from the 15th and 16th centuries, with a restoration by E. A. Landsdowne in 1880–81.

When local historian Fred Hando visited in the late 1950s, the ruins of a chapel dedicated to St Bartholomew were still standing. From the later 19th century, the mill at Llwynau was operated by a Henry Moore and his seven sons, one of whom was said to have buried the mill wheel under the floor when the mill finally ceased operations. The farmhouse at Llwynau dates from the 17th century.

A Norman stone medieval castle is sited close to the village.
