= Llangybi, Monmouthshire =

Llangybi
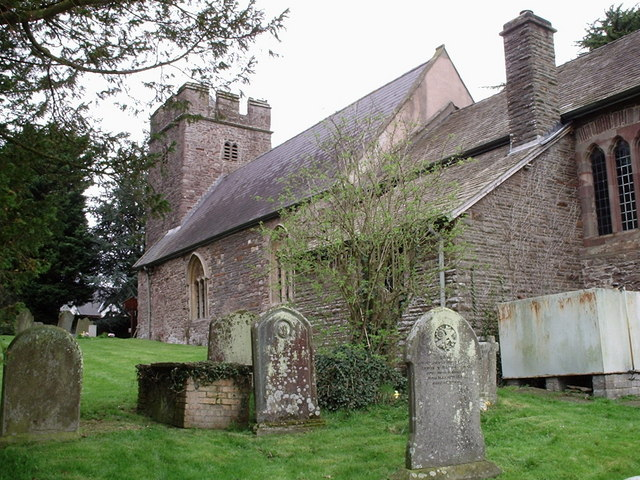
- St. Cybi's Church

- Location within Monmouthshire
- Population: 890 (444 living in town) (2011)
- OS grid reference: ST372967
- Principal area: Monmouthshire
- Preserved county: Gwent
- Country: Wales
- Sovereign state: United Kingdom
- Post town: USK
- Postcode district: NP15
- Post town: NEWPORT
- Postcode district: NP18
- Dialling code: 01633
- Police: Gwent
- Fire: South Wales
- Ambulance: Welsh
- UK Parliament: Monmouth
- List of places UK Wales Monmouthshire 51.6658°N 2.9079°W Map of the community

Llangybi (also spelled Llangibby) is a village and community in Monmouthshire, in southeast Wales, in the United Kingdom. It is located 3 miles (4.8 km) south of the town of Usk and 5 miles (8 km) north of Caerleon, in the valley of the River Usk.

In 2011 the village itself had a population of 444, with a nearly equal number living in its outlying areas, among them the settlement of Tregrug, near the ruins of a medieval castle.

== History and buildings ==
The village was traditionally founded by the 6th century Cornish Saint Cybi. According to legend, he is supposed to have crossed the Bristol Channel with ten followers. The Life of St. Cybi (Note: The Life of St. Cybi was written in the c. 12th century, six centuries after the c. 6th century events it describes. Scholars believe the compiler used fragmentary records or based it on community memory.) It records that the local duke, Edelig (Note: Edelig was one of the 21 sons of King Glywys of Glywysing.) threatened to evict them from his land, but as he approached them he fell from his horse, which died, and he and his men became blind. Edelig then prostrated himself and gave his body and soul to God, and he and his attendants were immediately cured and the horse restored to life.

In thanks (or terror), Edelig then gave Cybi land for two churches, including the one which became known as Llangybi, and another at an unspecified location (possibly Llandegfedd, a neighbouring village) where Cybi is reported to have left a handbell.

=== Church of St. Cybi ===
The existing church, dedicated to St. Cybi (or Cuby), has been described as "one of the most interesting in the Usk valley" and "a delight". The church is a grade II* listed building. The church is in regular use and is now part of the Usk Ministry Area, with churches including Tredunnock, Llandegvedd and Coed-y-paen.

The tower, nave and chancel all date from the 13th~14th century, and the church has 17th century internal fittings, including the pulpit, font, and monuments to the local Williams family. There are also wall paintings dating from the late medieval period and the 17th century. One wall painting of particular interest is a "Christ of the trades" (or a "Sunday Christ") of which there are very few in the U.K.

A traditional well outside the church is also named for St. Cybi.

Although regular services continued to be held in St. Cybi's chancel, the church was temporarily closed in 2015, after major problems were discovered with water penetrating its walls. Professional inspections revealed that the ceiling was at risk and several rare 15th and 17th century paintings were in danger of falling off the walls from hidden damp. The estimated cost of renovation work was put at £100,000, and a local fund-raising campaign was established. In October 2015 Monmouth MP David Davies donated two open-return first-class train tickets to Rev. Love (Note: In October 2015, the reverend Pamela Love was the assistant curate for the four churches in the Llangybi group.) as fundraising prizes.

=== Tregrug Castle ===
The site of Tregrug Castle, (also known as Llangybi Castle, Llangibby Castle, or Tregruk Castle), is located almost a mile outside the village (51°40′18.13728″N 2°55′13.70676″W) adjacent to the even smaller settlement of Tregrug or Tregruk.

Surrounded by dense woodland, the remaining ruins of the castle include a huge, nearly rectangular walled enclosure on the top of the hill, surrounded by banks and ditches; the remains of a large stone tower, known as the "Lord's Tower"; and a gatehouse.

=== The White Hart ===
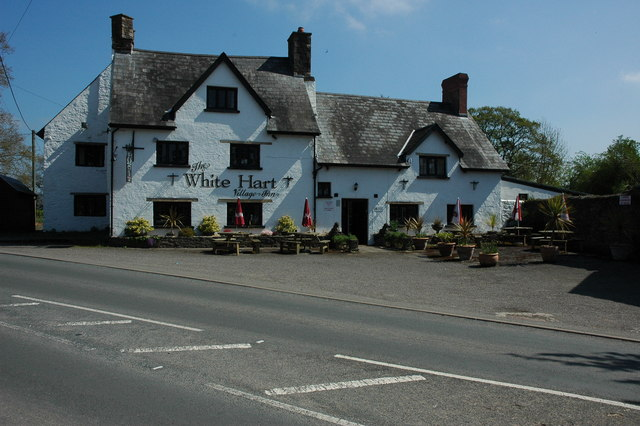
The White Hart

The White Hart inn, a grade II* listed building, was first built in the early 16th century and became the property of Henry VIII as part of Jane Seymour's wedding dowry. A century later Oliver Cromwell is reputed to have used it as his headquarters in Monmouthshire during the English Civil War. The Catholic martyr David Lewis preached in the inn when the church was closed to him; he was executed in Usk in 1679.

The interior retains no fewer than 11 fireplaces from the 17th century, a wealth of exposed beams, original Tudor period plasterwork, and a priest hole. A refurbishment of the inn was completed in April 2007.

In 2003 Philip Edwards (Note: Philip Edwards was formerly the "King Alfred professor of English literature" at Liverpool University.) proposed that T. S. Eliot made cryptic reference to the pub, and to the village well, in his 1935 poem "Usk".

=== Murder of the Watkins family ===
On 17 July 1878 Spanish sailor Josef Garcia murdered the Llangybi family of William Watkins, his wife Elizabeth (who was seven months pregnant) and their three youngest children: Charlotte aged 8 years, Alice aged 5 years and Frederick aged 4 years. Garcia was put on trial at Gloucester, convicted, and hanged at Usk Prison. The Monmouthshire Merlin described the crime as "unparalleled in atrocity in the annals of crime in Great Britain".

== Governance ==
Llangybi is included in the Llangybi Fawr electoral ward, which stretches northeast–southwest from Llantrisant to Llanhennock. The total population of this ward at the 2011 census was 1,861.
