= Caer Gybi (fort) =

Roman fortlet remains in Anglesey, Wales

- Anglesey, Wales, UK
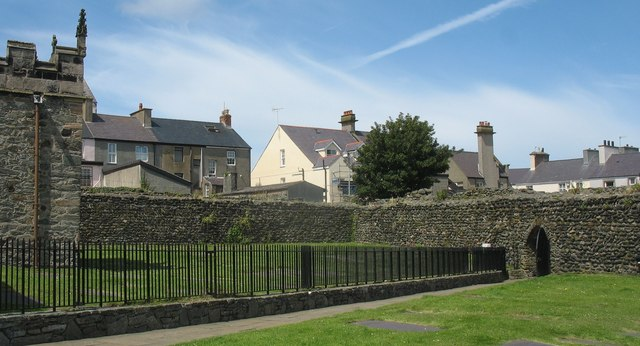
- Roman Wall surrounding St Cybi's Church

Location
- Location in Anglesey
- Coordinates: 53.3118°N 4.6328°W
- Grid reference: SH247826

Caer Gybi was a small fortlet and naval base in Roman Wales in the Roman province of Britannia Superior built sometime in the 3rd or 4th century. It stands at the centre of Holyhead in the Welsh county of Anglesey.

== History ==
The exact date of the fort's construction is unknown, but it is believed to have been built between the late 3rd-century or early 4th-century. It is thought to have been a smaller outpost of the larger Segontium fort, which was used to defend the west coast against Irish sea-raiders. The Romans also built a watch tower, within Mynydd y Twr on the top of Holyhead Mountain, which was possibly used as the fort's look-out point. Both were possibly abandoned around 393, when the troops were sent to respond to the revolt of Eugenius of Gaul.

In the 6th century, King Maelgwn Gwynedd gave the old fort to Saint Cybi, who founded a monastery there. The Church of St Cybi still stands on the site today, with a small detached chapel (Eglwys y Bedd) that reputedly stands over Cybi's grave.

== Architecture ==
The fort had three defensive walls and at the corner of each of the walls stood a circular watch tower, with the fourth side fronting the sea and was probably the site of a quay for the patrolling Roman warships.

The herringbone patterned walls of the fort are 4 metres high and 1.5 metres thick. Remnants of the corner towers are still visible, with the most prominent being the north-east tower which stands at 7.9 metres tall; however, the top section of the tower was possibly rebuilt during the medieval period. An excavation outside the northern walls uncovered an adjoining building to the fort's north-west tower, with a similar construction to the tower, and was likely to have also been Roman.
