= Theodore (given name) =

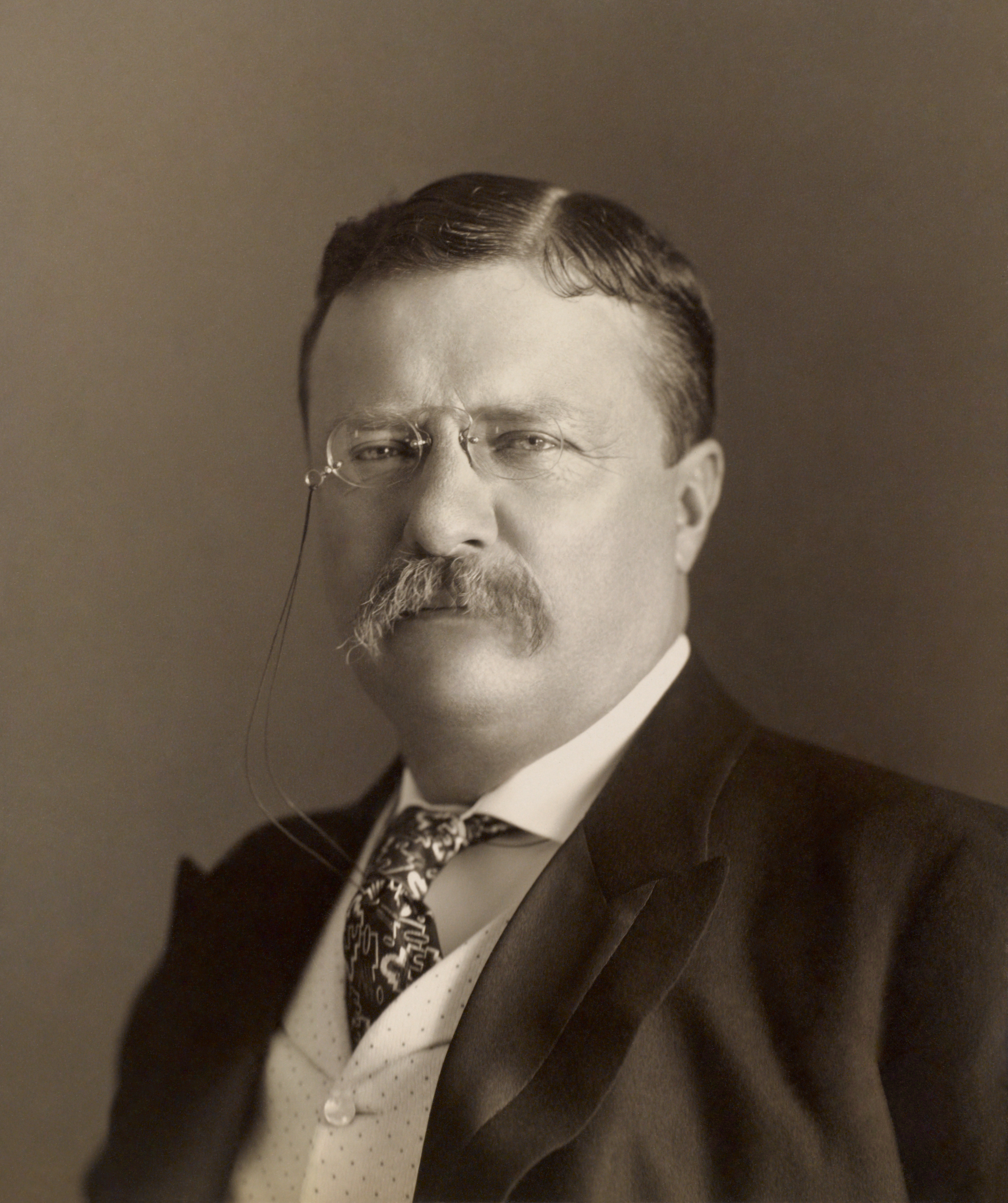
- Theodore Roosevelt, the 26th president of United States
- Pronunciation: English: /ˈθiːədɔːr/
- Gender: Male
- Name day: 9 November; Croatia, Denmark, Estonia, Finland, France, Germany, Latvia, Lithuania, Norway, Poland, Slovakia and Sweden; Alternative dates 7 March: Bulgaria; 12 May: Greece; 23 October: Czech Republic

Origin
- Origin: Greek
- Meaning: "gift of God"

Other names
- Nicknames: Ted, Teddy, Theo
- Related names: Teodoro, Theodora, Theodorus, Teodor, Todor, Fyodor, Dorothy

Theodore is a masculine given name. It comes from the Ancient Greek name Θεόδωρος (Theódoros), meaning "gift of God" (from the Ancient Greek words θεό, (theó) "God" and δῶρον (dṓron) "gift"). The name was borne by several figures in ancient Greece, such as Theodorus of Samos and Theodorus of Byzantium.

The name has risen in popularity across the Anglosphere during the 2010s and 2020s. The character Ted Mosby on the popular American sitcom How I Met Your Mother, which aired from 2005 to 2014, might have influenced increased usage of the name. Modern parents more often use the diminutive Theo than Ted. Theodore was among the five most popular names for White newborn boys in the American state of Virginia in 2022. It has been among the ten most popular names for newborn boys nationally in the United States since 2021. It has been a similarly popular name for boys in Canada. The feminine form of Theodore is Theodora. In German, Theodore is the feminine form of Theodor.

Although similar to, and probably influenced by, the Germanic name Theodoric (and variants Theodoricus, Dietrich, Thierry, and others) have separate origins.

== Variants and cognates ==
Language	Variant(s)	Notes
Albanian	Teodor, Theodhor, Dhori	
Amharic	Tewodros (ቴዎድሮስ)	
Arabic	Tawadros (تواضروس)	
Arabic	Hibatullah	Similar in translation to the Greek name
Aramaic	Teodoros (ܬܐܘܕܘܪܘܣ)	
Aramaic	Yahballaha (ܝܗܒܐܠܗܐ)	Translation of original Greek
Armenian	Thoros (Թորոս)	
Armenian	Astvacatur (Աստուածատուր), Asatur (Ասատուր)	Translation of original Greek
Belarusian	Fiodar (Фёдар), Todar (Тодар), Teador (Тэадор)	
Belarusian	Bahdan (Багдан)	Translation of Greek original
Bulgarian	Todor (Тодор), Teodor (Теодор)	
Bulgarian	Božidar (Божидар), Bogdan (Богдан)	Translation of original Greek
Catalan	Teodor	
Czech	Teodor, Theodor	
Czech	Bohdan	Translation of original Greek
Danish	Teodor, Theodor	
Dutch	Theodoor, Theodorus	
English	Theodore	
Esperanto	Teodoro	
Estonian	Theodor, Teodor, Tuudor, Tuudur	
Ethiopian and Eritrean	Tedros (ቴድሮስ), Tewodros (ቴዎድሮስ)	
Finnish	Teuvo, Teodor	
French	Théodore	
French	Dieudonné	Translation of original Greek
Georgian	Teodor (თევდორე)	
German	Theodor	
Greek	Theódoros (Θεόδωρος), Thódoros (Θόδωρος), Thodorís (Θοδωρής), Theodorákis (Θεοδωράκης), Theodósios (Θεοδόσιος, Theodosius), Thódos (Θώδος), Thódis (Θώδης), Dóros (Δώρος), Dóris (Δώρης), Theodhori (Θεοδορι)	
Hebrew	Teodor (תאודור), Tiodor (תיאודור)	
Hungarian	Tivadar, Tódor	From Greek via Arabic
Indonesian	Theodore, Theodorus, Theodor, Theodoor	
Irish	Téadóir	
Italian	Teodoro	
Italian	Donato, Donatello	Similar in translation to the Greek name
Kazakh	Shodyr (Шодыр)	
Kazakh	Kudaibergen, Kūdaiberdi, Täñirbergen, Täñirberdi	Similar in translation to the Greek name
Latin	Theodorus	
Latvian	Teodors	
Lithuanian	Teodoras	
Macedonia	Teodor (Теодор)	
Norwegian	Teodor, Theodor	
Polish	Teodor	
Polish	Bożydar, Bogdan, Bohdan	Translation of original Greek
Portuguese	Teodoro, Deodoro	
Romanian	Tudor (also a surname), Teodor	
Romanian	Bogdan	From Slavic languages
Russian	Fyodor (Фёдор), Fedor (Федор), Feodor (Феодор)	
Russian	Bogdan (Богдан).	Translation of original Greek
Scottish Gaelic	Feadair	
Serbo-Croatian	Teodor (Теодор), Todor (Тодор)	
Serbo-Croatian	Božidar (Божидар), Bogdan (Богдан)	Translation of original Greek
Sicilian	Teodoru	
Slovene	Teodor	
Sanskrit	Devadatta (देवदत्त)	From Indic languages
Spanish	Teodoro	
Spanish	Diosdado	Translation of original Greek
Swedish	Teodor, Theodor	
Tagalog	Teodoro	
Turkish	Tevazirus	From Greek via Arabic
Ukrainian	Fedir (Федір), Fedor (Федор), Teodor (Теодор), Khvedir (Хведір), Fedio (Федьо)	
Ukrainian	Bohdan (Богдан), Bohodar (Богодар)	Translation of original Greek
Welsh	Tewdwr	

== Diminutives ==
Hypocorisms, calling names, or nicknames derived from Theodore can be:

Language	Form	Nickname(s)	Notes
Bulgarian	Božidar	Božo (Божо)	
Bulgarian	Teodor (Теодор)	Teo (Тео), Teddy (Теди)	
Bulgarian	Todor	Tosh(k)o (Тош(к)о)	
Danish	T(h)eodor	Teo and Theo	
Dutch	Theodoor, Theodorus	Dorus and Theo	
English	Theodore	Ted, Teddy, Theo	
Finnish	Teodor, Teuvu	Teo	
French	Dieudonné, Théodore	Théo	
German	Theodor	Theo	
Georgian	Teodor	Tedo (თედო)	
Greek	Theódoros (Θεόδωρος)	Dóros (Δώρος)	
Indonesian	Theodore, Theodor, Theodoor, Theodorus	Dorus and Theo	
Italian	Teodoro	Teo	
Norwegian	T(h)eodor	Teo and Theo	
Portuguese	Teodoro	Teo	
Russian	Feodor, Fodor, Fyodor	Fedya (Федя)	
Spanish	Teodoro	Teo	
Swedish	T(h)eodor	Teo and Theo	
Tagalog	Teodoro	Ted and Teddy	Influenced by English language
Ukrainian	Bogdan	Bodya (Бодя)	

== People named Theodore ==
=== Ancient world ===
Ordered chronologically

- Theodore Tiron (died 306), Byzantine martyr and Warrior Saint
- Theodore Stratelates (died 319), Byzantine martyr and Warrior Saint
- Theodore of Mopsuestia (c. 350 – 428), Byzantine bishop
- Theodore of Enaton, 5th-century Syrian Christian monk
- Theodore of Pherme, 4th-century Egyptian Christian monk
- Theodore of Tarsus (602–690), Archbishop of Canterbury
- Theodore (brother of Heraclius) (fl. c. 610–636), Byzantine general
- Theodore (prefect of Egypt) (fl. c. 640), Byzantine general
- Theodore Trithyrius (died 636), Byzantine treasurer and military commander
- Pope Theodore I, Pope from 642 to 649
- Theodore I Calliopas, Exarch of Ravenna (643 – c. 645 and 653 – before 666)
- Theodore Abu Qurrah (c. 750 – c. 823), Christian Arab theologian
- Theodore the Studite (759–826), Byzantine Greek monk and abbot
- Pope Theodore II (840–897), Pope in 897
- Theodore Gabras, 11th-century Byzantine military leader and martyr
- Theodore Prodromos (c. 1100 – c. 1165), Byzantine writer and poet
- Theodore Balsamon, 12th-century Eastern Orthodox Patriarch of Antioch
- Theodore I Laskaris (c. 1174 – c. 1222), first Emperor of Nicaea
- Theodore Komnenos Doukas (died c. 1253), Emperor of Thessalonica
- Theodore II Laskaris (c. 1222 – 1258), Emperor of Nicaea
- Theodore Metochites (1270–1332), Byzantine statesman, author and philosopher
- Theodore Svetoslav of Bulgaria, Tsar of Bulgaria from 1300 to 1322
- Theodore I Palaiologos (c. 1355 – 1407), Byzantine despot
- Theodore Kantakouzenos (died 1410), Byzantine nobleman
- Theodore II Palaiologos (c. 1396 – 1448), Byzantine despot

=== Modern world ===
Ordered by last name, where available; otherwise chronologically

- Theodore I of Corsica (1694–1756), German adventurer who was briefly King of Corsica
- Pope Theodoros II of Alexandria (born 1952), leader of the Coptic Orthodox Church of Alexandria
- Patriarch Theodore II of Alexandria (born 1954), Eastern Orthodox Patriarch of Alexandria and all Africa
- Theodore Fred Abel (1896–1988), American sociology professor
- Theodore Abrahamson (1900–1978), member of the Wisconsin State Assembly
- Theodore C. Achilles (1905–1986), American diplomat
- Theodore Kwami Adzoe, Ghanaian Supreme Court Judge
- Theodore Agnew (born 1961), British businessman, Baron Agnew of Oulton, life peer, and Minister of State
- Ted Ainley (1903–1968), British trade union leader and communist activist
- Theodore Albrecht (born 1945), American music historian
- Theodore C. Almquist (1941–2010), United States Air Force general
- Theodore Anderson (1878–1926), Australian cricketer
- Theodore Wilbur Anderson (1918–2016), American mathematician and statistician
- Theodore Angelopoulos (born 1943), Greek shipping and steel magnate
- Theodore Annemann (1907–1942), American professional magician
- Theodore Antoniou (1935–2018), Greek composer and conductor
- Theodore Basil Anuka, Ghanaian politician
- Theodore Aplin (c. 1927–1991), Australian botanist
- T. Frank Appleby (1864–1924), American Republican Party politician
- Theodore Apsevdis, 13th-century Greek painter
- Theodore Aranda (1934–2022), Belizean politician
- Theodore Argles, American journalist
- Theodore Atkinson (1697–1779), American politician, lawyer and militia officer
- Theodore Aylward Sr., English organist
- Theodore Bachenheimer (1923–1944), United States Army officer
- Theodore F. Bagge (1820–1886), American politician
- Theodore Baker (1851–1934), American musicologist
- Theodore Anderson Baldwin (1839–1925), United States Army general
- Theodore Cotillo Barbarossa (1906–1992), American sculptor
- Theodore X. Barber (1927–2005), American hypnosis expert
- Theodore H. Barrett (1834–1900), American Brevet Brigadier General
- Theodore Ward Barrow, American art historian and skateboarder
- S. Theodore Baskaran, Indian film historian
- Theodore Baskin (born 1950), American musician
- Theodore Bathurst, English poet and translator
- Theodore Bauer (bobsledder), West German bobsledder
- Theodore J. Bauer (1909–2005), American physician
- Theodore Beauchaine, American psychologist
- Theodore Beck (1859–1899), British academic
- Theodore Beggs (1859–1940), Australian politician
- Theodore Arlington Bell (1872–1922), American politician
- Theodore Bendix (1862–1935), American composer and musical director
- Theodore Hutson Benedict (1821–1885), American politician
- Theodore Benfey, American politician
- Theodore Bent (1852–1897), British archaeologist and explorer in the Levant, Africa, and Southern Arabia
- Theodore Berlin (1938–1987), American politician
- Theodore H. Berlin (1917–1962), American theoretical physicist
- Theodore Menline Bernstein (1904–1979), American newspaper editor
- Theodore Besterman (1904–1976), Polish-born British researcher, bibliographer, biographer and translator
- Theodore Bestor (1951–2021), American anthropologist
- Theodore Beza (1519–1605), French Protestant theologian and scholar
- Theodore Bibb (1918–2010), American jazz drummer
- Theodore Bibliander (1509–1564), Swiss Orientalist, publisher and linguist
- Theodore Bikel (1924–2015), Austrian-American actor, folksinger, composer and unionist
- Theodore G. Bilbo (1877–1947), American politician
- Theodore A. Bingham (1858–1934), American police commissioner
- Theodore Birkbeck, British Army general
- Theodore Birkett (1918–?), Barbadian cricketer
- Theodore H. Blau (1928–2003), American psychologist
- Theodore Bloomfield (1923–1998), American conductor
- Theodore Davis Boal (1867–1938), American architect and army officer
- Theodore Boborol (born 1979), Filipino film and television director
- Theodore Bodenwein, German-American newspaper publisher and politician
- Theodore Bodra (1917–?), Indian politician
- Theodore Boronovskis (born 1943), Australian Olympic judoka
- Theodore Boyett (1912–1987), American football coach
- Theodore Brameld (1904–1987), American philosopher
- Theodore Brandley (1851–1928), Swiss Mormon missionary
- Theodore M. Brantley (1851–1922), American judge
- Theodore DuBose Bratton (1862–1944), American bishop
- Theodore W. Brazeau (1873–1965), American politician
- Theodore Brenson (1893–1959), American artist
- Theodore Brentano (1854–1940), American judge
- Theodore W. Brevard Jr. (1835–1882), American politician and Confederate Army officer
- Teddy Bridgewater (born 1992), American football player
- Theodore J. van den Broek (1783–1851), Dutch missionary
- Theodore F. Brophy (1923–2020), American businessman and telecommunications professional
- Theodore Bruback (1851–1904), American businessman
- Theodore Bruce (1847–1911), Australian politician
- Theodore Brune, German-American architect
- Theodore Alois Buckley (1825–1856), English classicist and translator
- Theodore Bugas (1924–2022), American politician
- Theodore Holmes Bullock (1915–2005), American neuroscientist
- Theodore Bundy (1946–1989), prolific American serial killer, rapist, kidnapper, and necrophile
- Theodore Weld Burdick (1836–1898), American politician
- Theodore Burr (1771–1822), American inventor and civil engineer
- Theodore Arthur Burrows (1857–1929), Canadian politician
- Theodore Earl Butler (1861–1936), American painter
- Theodore V. Buttrey Jr. (1929–2018), American educator, classicist and numismatist
- Theodore Cable, Indianapolis politician
- Theodore L. Cairns (1914–1994), American chemist
- Theodore Cantor (1809–1860), Danish physician, zoologist and botanist
- Theodore Carpenter (1898–1975), American jazz musician and bandleader
- Theodore Carr (1866–1931), British politician
- Theodore Carstens (1879–1955), American fencer
- Theodore Case (1888–1944), American chemist and inventor
- Theodore S. Case (1832–1900), American businessman, military officer, professor and physician
- Theodore E. Chandler (1894–1945), United States Navy admiral
- Theodore Chanler (1902–1961), American composer
- Theodore S. Chapman (1849–1914), American politician, lawyer and businessman
- Theodore William Chaundy (1889–1966), English mathematician
- Theodore Seio Chihara (1929–2026), American mathematician
- Theodore Christianson (1883–1948), American politician
- Theodore Christianson (judge) (1913–1955), American judge
- Theodore Christman, American composer
- Theodore D. Chuang (born 1969), American judge
- Theodore Clapp (1792–1866), American minister
- Theodore Clarke (1860–?), Barbadian cricketer
- Theodore S. Clerk (1909–1965), Ghanaian architect and urban planner
- Theodore S. Coberly (1921–2011), United States Air Force general
- Theodore D. A. Cockerell (1866–1948), American entomologist
- Theodore Cogswell (1918–1987), American writer
- Theodore Colbert III (born 1973), American businessman and engineer
- Theodore B. Comstock (1849–1915), American geologist
- Theodore Edward Coneys (1882–1967), American murderer
- Theodore Conkey (1819–1880), American pioneer and politician
- Theodore Conover (1868–1910), American baseball player
- Theodore Conrad (1910–1994), American architect, preservationist and a leading architectural model maker
- Theodore John Conrad (1949–2021), American fugitive
- Theodore Conrath (1920–1995), American painter and sculptor
- Theodore J. Conway (1909–1990), United States Army four-star general
- Theodore Cooper (1839–1919), American civil engineer
- Theodore Bayard Fletcher Copp (1902–1945), American author
- Theodore James Courant, American mathematician
- Theodore F. Craver Jr., American business executive
- Theodore Criley (1880–1930), American painter
- Theodore G. Croft (1874–1920), American politician
- Theodore Cross (1924–2010), American lawyer
- Theodore E. Cummings (1907–1982), Austrian-born American diplomat
- Theodore Curphey (1897–1986), American coroner
- Ted Curson (1935–2012), American jazz trumpeter

Theodore S. Curtis (1900–1988), American coach, administrator, and politician

- Theodore S. Curtis Jr. (1940–2015), American politician
- Theodore Czebotar (1915–1996), American painter
- Theodore Dakpogan, Beninese artist
- Theodore Dalrymple (born 1949), English cultural critic and author
- Theodore Dammann, American politician
- Theodore Davie (1852–1898), Canadian politician
- Theodore D. Day (1917–2003), American farmer and politician
- Theodore Low De Vinne (1828–1914), American printer and typographer
- Theodore Debs (1864–1945), American politician
- Theodore Dehon (1776–1817), American bishop
- Theodore C. Delaplane (died 1900), American politician
- Theodore Delevoryas (1929–2017), American paleobotanist
- Theodore Dieckmann (1853–1919), American politician and businessman
- Theodore C. Diers (1880–1942), American actor, politician, and writer
- Theodore Dikanda (born 1966), Swedish wrestler
- Theodore John Dimitry Jr. (1879–1945), Louisiana Creole physician and professor
- Theodore Ayrault Dodge (1842–1909), United States Army officer and author
- Theodore Dollarhide (1948–2014), American composer, conductor and music educator
- Theodore Doxford (1841–1916), British politician
- Theodore S. Drachman (1904–1988), American novelist
- Theodore W. Drake (1907–2000), American cartoonist
- Theodore Drange (born 1934), American philosopher
- Theodore Draper (1912–2006), American historian, social activist and writer
- Theodore Dreiser (1871–1945), American novelist
- Theodore Dunham Jr. (1897–1984), American astronomer and physicist
- Theodore Durrant (c. 1871–1898), American murderer
- Theodore Dury (1854–1932), English cricketer
- Theodore Miller Edison (1898–1992), American inventor
- Theodore L. Eliot Jr. (1928–2019), American diplomat
- Theodore G. Ellyson (1885–1928), first United States Navy officer designated as an aviator
- Theodore von Eltz (1893–1964), American actor
- Theodore N. Ely (1846–1916), American railroad executive
- Theodore Engel (1866–1935), American politician
- Theodore Enslin (1925–2011), American poet
- Theodore Epp (1907–1985), American pastor and radio broadcaster
- Theodore Eustace, Count Palatine of Sulzbach (1659–1732)
- Theodore Tracy Fairchild (1865–1950), American politician
- Theodore A. Farwell (1931–2015), American Nordic combined skier
- Theodore Fawcett (1832–1898), Australian politician
- Theodore Sedgwick Fay (1807–1898), American diplomat
- T. R. Fehrenbach (1925–2013), American historian
- Theodore Pollock Ferguson (1853–1920), American minister
- Theodore B. Fernald, American linguist
- Theodore E. Ferris (1872–1953), American naval architect
- Theodore Henry Adolphus Fielding (1781–1851), English painter
- Theodore Fink (1855–1942), Australian politician
- Theodore J. Flicker (1930–2014), American dramatist
- Theodore Thomson Flynn (1883–1968), Australian zoologist
- Theodore Foley (1913–1974), Roman Catholic priest
- Theodore Fontaine (1941–2021), Canadian community leader and author
- Theodore J. Forstmann (1940–2011), American private equity investor
- Theodore Foster (1752–1828), American politician
- Theodore Fowler (1879–1915), English cricketer
- Theodore Fortescue Fox (1899–1989), British physician and medical editor
- Theodore Frankel (1929–2017), American mathematician
- Theodore Freeman (1930–1964), American aeronautical engineer, test pilot and NASA astronaut
- Theodore Frelinghuysen (1787–1862), American politician
- Theodore Fried (1902–1980), Hungarian artist
- Theodore Friedman (1908–1992), American conservative rabbi
- Theodore Friedmann, American researcher
- Theodore Friend (1931–2020), American historian and novelist
- Theodore Fritz (1851–1922), American politician
- Theodore C. Froemming (1873–1929), American politician
- Theodore Fry (1836–1912), English politician
- Theodore I. Fry (1881–1962), Michigan politician
- Theodore Leslie Futch (1895–1992), United States Army general
- Theodore Fyfe (1875–1945), Scottish architect
- Theodore Galante (born 1963), American architect
- Theodore Gamelin, American mathematician
- Theodore Yale Gardner (1841–1900), Reverend and first pastor of Glenville, Cleveland
- Theodore G. Garfield (1894–1989), American judge
- Theodore Garland Jr. (born 1956), American biologist
- Theodore Garman (1924–1954), English painter
- Theodore J. Garrish (born 1943), American government official
- Theodore Gass, Florida state legislator
- Theodore H. Geballe (1920–2021), American physicist
- Theodore Thurston Geer (1851–1924), 10th Governor of Oregon
- Theodore Gegoux (1850–1931), Canadian artist
- Theodore George, American philosopher
- Théodore Géricault (1791–1824), French Romantic painter
- Theodore E. Gildred (1935–2019), American businessman and diplomat
- Theodore Gill (1837–1914), American zoologist and librarian
- Theodore Gilman (1841–1930), American banker and reform advocate
- Theodore L. Glasser, American academic
- Theodore Gleason (1904–1975), American politician
- Theodore Gleim (born 1933), Canadian politician
- Theodore A. Glynn (1881–1950), American politician
- Theodore Sedgwick Gold (1818–1906), American farmer and schoolteacher
- Theodore W. Goldin (1858–1935), United States Army Medal of Honor recipient
- Theodore Roy Golubic (1928–1998), American artist
- Theodore Goodson III (born 1969), American chemist
- Theodore Gordon (1786–1845), Scottish inspector of army hospitals
- Theodore Goulston (c. 1572–1632), English physician
- Theodore Gourdin (1764–1826), American politician
- Theodore Gray (born 1964), American science author
- Theodore Green (1925–1999), Australian race horse trainer and jockey mentor
- Theodore F. Green (1867–1966), American politician
- Theodore Gregory (1890–1970), British economist
- Theodore W. Greig (1843–1893), American Civil War Medal of Honor recipient
- Theodore Gross (1880–1951), American gymnast
- Theodore Haak, German scholar
- Theodore Hack (1840–1902), Australian politician
- Theodore Hall (1925–1999), American physicist and atomic spy for the Soviet Union
- Theodore N. Haller (1864–1930), American lawyer
- Theodore Hallett (1878–1956), Royal Navy Vice Admiral
- Theodore Hamberg (1819–1854), Swedish missionary
- Theodore Hamm (1825–1903), American brewery executive
- Theodore E. Hancock (1847–1916), American lawyer
- Theodore Hancock (1923–1989), American artist
- Theodore Hantke (1875–1931), Australian cricketer
- Theodore Hardeen (1876–1945), Hungarian-American entertainer
- Theodore Harden, Australian politician
- Theodore Hardy (1863–1918), British military chaplain
- Theodore Harrison (1876–1965), American opera singer
- Theodore Hart (1816–1887), Canadian businessman
- Theodore Haultain (1817–1902), New Zealand politician and botanist
- Theodore Hauman (1808–1878), Belgian violinist and teacher
- Theodore Havemeyer (1839–1897), American businessman
- Theodore Hesburgh (1917–2015), 15th President of the University of Notre Dame
- Theodore Heuck (1830–1877), American architect
- Theodore Hinsdale, American politician
- Theodore H. Hittell (1830–1917), historian, state senator, and writer
- Theodore Holland (1878–1947), British composer and academic
- Theodore Holstein (1915–1985), American theoretical physicist
- Theodore Holtebeck (1883–1963), American politician and businessman
- Theodore Hook, English intellectual and composer
- Theodore Hope (lawyer) (1903–1998), American lawyer
- Theodore Hope (1831–1915), British-born civil servant in the government of India
- Theodore Hoskins (born 1938), American politician
- Theodore Hough (1865–1924), American physiologist
- Theodore van Houten (1962–2016), Dutch program maker, writer and journalist
- Theodore Hoyle (1884–1953), English cricketer
- Theodore Hubback (1872–1942), English cricketer, conservationist and author
- Theodore Hukriede (1878–1945), American politician
- Theodore L. Hullar (born 1935), American university chancellor
- Theodore G. Hunt (1805–1893), American politician
- Theodore A. Hurd (1819–1899), American judge
- Theodore Hyatt (1830–1900), American Civil War Medal of Honor recipient
- Theodore Illion (1898–1984), Canadian travel book writer
- Theodore Isley (1912–2004), Canadian politician
- Theodore Henley Jack (1881–1964), American college president
- Theodore Jacobsen (c. 1724–1772), English merchant and architect
- Theodore Janssen, French-born English financier and member of parliament
- Theodore Jantjies (born 1983), South African actor
- Theodore Jasper (1814–1897), American painter
- T. J. Jemison (1918–2013), American clergyman and civil rights activist
- Theodore G. Jenes Jr. (1930–2023), United States Army general
- Theodore Frelinghuysen Jewell (1844–1932), rear admiral of the United States Navy
- Theodore Joset (1804–1842), Swiss priest
- Theodore Joslin (1890–1944), American politician
- Theodore Judah (1826–1863), American businessman
- Theodore Judson (born 1951), American writer
- Theodore Jurewicz, American painter
- Theodore Just (1886–1937), British middle-distance runner
- Theodore Kaczynski (1942–2023), American letter bomber
- Theodore Kaghan (1912–1989), American dramatist
- Theodore Kanamine (1929–2023), American general officer
- Theodore Kanavas (1961–2017), American politician
- Theodore Kara (1916–1944), American boxer
- Theodore Karamanski, American historian
- Theodore von Kármán (1881–1963), Hungarian-American mathematician, aerospace engineer and physicist
- Theodore Cyrus Karp (1926–2015), American musicologist
- Theodore Kassinger (born 1953), American government official
- Theodore Katsanevas (1947–2021), Greek academic and politician
- Theodore H. Kattouf, American diplomat
- Theodore N. Kaufman (1910–1986), American activist
- Theodore Kaufmann (1814–1896), German-born American painter
- Theodore Kavalliotis (1718–1789), Greek Orthodox priest, teacher and a figure of the Greek Enlightenment
- Theodore Kazanov (born 1973), Metropolitan of the Russian Orthodox Church
- Theodore Keep (1924–2007), American record producer
- Theodore W. Kheel (1914–2010), American lawyer
- Theodore Khoury (1930–2023), Lebanese Catholic theologian
- Theodore "Ted" Nieman Kincannon (1896–1936), American aviator
- T. C. Kingsmill Moore (1893–1979), Irish judge, politician and author
- Theodore Kisiel (1930–2021), American philosopher
- Theodore Kitching (1866–1930), English Salvationist
- Theodore F. Kluttz (1848–1918), American politician
- Theodore Knapstein (1848–1917), American politician
- Theodore Knauth (1885–1962), investment banker, journalist and government official
- T. R. Knight (born 1973), American actor
- Theodore Wesley Koch (1871–1941), American librarian
- Theodore Kodjo Agadzi (1919–2005), Ghanaian politician
- Theodore Koehler (1856–1929), American politician
- Theodoros Kolokotronis (1770–1843), Greek General and pre-eminent leader of the Greek War of Independence (1821–1829) against the Ottoman Empire.
- Theodore Komisarjevsky (1882–1954), Russian-British theatrical director
- Theodore I. Koskoff (1913–1989), American lawyer
- Theodore Kosloff (1882–1956), Russian-American ballet dancer, choreographer and actor
- Theodore L. Kramer (c. 1847–1910), American civil war soldier
- Theodore Kremer (1871–1923), American dramatist
- Theodore Kryzak (died 2022), American politician
- Theodore Ku-DiPietro (born 2002), American soccer player
- Theodore Kuchar (born 1963), American-Ukrainian conductor
- Ted Kulongoski (born 1940), American judge and politician
- Theodore Kuwana (1931–2022), Japanese American chemist
- Theodore Kwasman, American Assyriologist
- Theodore Kyriakou (born 1974), Greek businessman
- Theodore de Laguna (1876–1930), American philosopher
- Theodore Lambrinos (1935–2021), Greek-American operatic baritone
- Theodore Lane (died 1828), English painter and engraver
- Theodore Otto Langerfeldt (1841–1906), German-born American painter
- Theodore K. Lawless (1892–1971), American dermatologist
- Theodore Forbes Leith (1746–1819), Scottish physician
- Theodore de Lemos (1850–1909), American architect
- Theodore Lenzen (1833–1912), Prussian-American architect
- Ted Leonsis (born 1957), American businessman
- Theodore Lettvin (1926–2003), American pianist and conductor
- Theodore Levin (1897–1970), American judge
- Theodore Levin (ethnomusicologist), American ethnomusicologist
- Theodore Levitt (1925–2006), American economist
- Theodore Lidz (1910–2001), American psychiatrist
- Theodore Lightner (1893–1981), American bridge player
- Theodore Link (1850–1923), German-born American architect
- Theodore Lipscomb, American politician
- Theodore Litovitz (1923–2006), American physicist
- Theodore Loblaw (1872–1933), American grocer
- Theodore Lorber (1906–1989), American fencer
- Theodore Lorch (1873–1947), American actor
- Theodore K. Lorenz (1842–1909), German ornithologist
- Theodore J. Lowi (1931–2017), political scientist
- Theodore Lukens (1848–1918), American conservationist and civic leader
- Theodore Lukits (1897–1992), American painter
- Theodore Lumpkin (1919–2020), Tuskegee Airman and United States Air Force officer
- Theodore C. Lyster (1875–1933), United States Army general
- Theodore E. Madey (1937–2008), American surface scientist
- Theodore Maiman (1927–2007), American engineer and physicist, inventor of the laser
- Theodore Major (1908–1999), English artist
- Theodore Makridi (1872–1940), Greek archaeologist
- Theodore Mills Maltbie (1842–1915), American politician
- Theodore Maly (1894–1938), former Roman Catholic priest and Soviet intelligence officer
- Theodore Manaen (1922–2020), Indian politician
- Theodore Augustine Mann (1735–1809), English naturalist, historian and Carthusian monk
- Theodore D. Mann (1922–1994), American politician
- Theodore Mann (1924–2012), American theatre producer and director
- Theodore Marburg (1862–1946), American jurist and diplomat
- Theodore Marier (1912–2001), American classical composer
- Theodore Marshall, Scottish minister
- Theodore Marston (1868–1920), American film director
- Theodore D. Martin (born 1960), United States Army general
- Theodore Martin (1816–1909), Scottish poet, biographer and translator
- Theodore Mascarenhas, Indian prelate of the Catholic Church
- Theodore Mavrogordato (1883–1941), British tennis player
- Theodore Maxwell, 19th-century English doctor and missionary
- Theodore Maynard (1890–1956), English poet literary critic and historian
- Theodore Howard McCaleb (1810–1864), American judge
- Theodore McCall (1911–1969), Australian Anglican bishop
- Theodore McCarrick (1930–2025), defrocked American prelate, former Catholic cardinal and archbishop
- Theodore H. McCrea (1908–1986), suffragan bishop
- Theodore W. McFarling (1929–2024), American politician
- Theodore McKee (born 1947), American judge
- Theodore McKeldin (1900–1974), American politician
- Theodore McLear (1879–1958), American wrestler
- Theodore F. MacManus (c. 1872–1940), American businessman and philanthropist
- Theodore McMillian (1919–2006), American judge
- Theodore McNeal (1905–1982), American politician
- Theodore Luqueer Mead (1852–1936), American naturalist and horticulturalist
- Theodore Meighen (1905–1979), Canadian lawyer and philanthropist
- Theodore Melfi (born 1970), American film director and producer
- Theodore Mendez (1934–1997), English painter
- Theodore W. Metcalfe (1894–1973), American politician
- Theodore Metz (1848–1936), German-born American bandleader and composer
- Theodore Doughty Miller (1835–1897), Baptist preacher
- Theodore Miller (1816–1895), American judge
- Theodore Millon (1928–2014), American psychologist
- Theodore Augustus Mills (1839–1916), American sculptor
- Theodore R. Milton (1915–2010), United States Air Force general
- Theodore L. Minier (1819–1895), American politician
- Theodore B. Mitchell (1890–1983), American entomologist
- Theodore William Moody (1907–1984), Northern Irish historian
- Theodore Mook (born 1953), American cellist
- Theodore Barcroft L. Moonemalle, Ceylonese lawyer
- Theodore Morde (1911–1954), American explorer, journalist and diplomat
- Theodore Morison (1863–1936), British educationalist
- Theodore L. Moritz (1892–1982), American politician
- Theodore Morse (1873–1924), American songwriter
- Theodore Motzkin (1908–1970), Israeli-American mathematician
- Theodore Moustakas, materials physicist
- Theodore T. Munger (1830–1910), American Congregational clergyman and writer
- Theodore W. Myers (1844–1918), American banker and politician
- Theodore "Fats" Navarro (1923–1950), American jazz trumpeter
- Theodore Newcomb (1903–1984), American social psychologist
- Ted Nierenberg (1923–2009), American business executive
- Theodore van der Noot, 8th Marquess of Assche (1818–1889), Belgian courtier and aristocrat
- Theodore W. Noyes (1858–1946), American journalist
- Ted Nugent (born 1948), American rock musician and gun advocate
- Theodore Odrach (1912–1964), Ukrainian (Belarusian) writer
- Theodore Odza (1915–1998), American visual artist
- Theodore H. Okiishi (born 1939), American mechanical engineer
- T. V. Olsen (1932–1993), American author
- Theodore Olson (1940–2024), American lawyer
- Theodore Orji (born 1950), Nigerian politician
- Theodore Osborn (1887–1973), British-born Australian botanist
- Theodore Otis (1810–1873), American politician
- Theodore J. Pahle (1899–1979), American cinematographer
- Theodore Sherman Palmer (1868–1955), American zoologist
- Theodore Braybrooke Panabokke (1909–1989), Sri Lankan Sinhala politician, lawyer, and diplomat
- Theodore Paraskevakos (born 1937), Greek inventor and businessman
- Theodore D. Parsons (1894–1978), American politician
- Theodore S. Parvin, American lawyer
- Theodore S. Peck (1843–1918), United States Army general and Medal of Honor recipient
- Theodore Pell (1878–1967), American tennis player
- Theodore Leighton Pennell (1867–1912), English missionary
- Theodore Duncan Perera, Sri Lankan Sinhala civil servant
- Theodore A. Peyser (1873–1937), American politician
- T. E. R. Phillips (1868–1942), English astronomer
- Theodore Pike (1904–1987), Irish colonial administrator and sports international
- Theodore C. Pilcher (1844–1917), American politician
- Theodore Plucknett (1897–1965), British legal historian
- Theodore M. Pomeroy (1824–1905), American politician
- Theodore L. Poole (1840–1900), American politician
- Theodore Poulakis (1622–1692), Greek painter
- T. F. Powys (1875–1953), British novelist and short-story writer
- Theodore Pratt (1901–1969), American writer
- Theodore Price (c. 1570–1631), Welsh Anglican clergyman and academic
- Theodore Puck (1916–2005), American geneticist
- Theodore K. Rabb (1937–2019), American historian
- Ted Raimi (born 1965), American actor
- Theodore F. Randolph (1826–1883), American politician
- Theodore I. Reese (1873–1931), bishop of the Episcopal Diocese of Southern Ohio
- Theodore Reff, American art historian
- Theodore H. Reverman (1877–1941), American prelate
- Theodore Rigg (1888–1972), New Zealand agricultural chemist and scientific administrator
- Theodore M. Riley (1842–1914), American Anglo-Catholic priest, author, and seminary professor
- Theodore Rinaldo (1944–2000), American charismatic religious leader and convicted child sex offender
- Theodore A. Ripley (1835–1866), American general
- Theodore Ritch (1894–1943), Russian tenor
- Theodore J. Rivlin (1926–2006), American mathematician
- Theodore Goodridge Roberts (1877–1953), Canadian novelist and poet
- Theodore Roberts (1861–1928), American film and stage actor
- Theodore Robinson (1852–1896), American Impressionist painter
- Theodore Roe (1898–1952), American mob boss
- Theodore Roethke (1908–1963), American poet
- Theodore L. Rogers (1880–1940), American politician
- Theodore Romzha (1911–1947), Ukrainian Ruthenian Catholic bishop
- Theodore Roscoe (1906–1992), American writer
- Theodore Rosengarten (born 1944), American historian
- Theodore H. Rowell (1905–1979), American politician
- Theodore Isaac Rubin (1923–2019), American psychiatrist and author
- Theodore Rudzinski (1857–?), American politician
- Theodore Runyon (1822–1896), American soldier, politician and diplomat
- Theodore D. Saar (1918–1981), American politician
- Theodore B. Sachs (1868–1916), American physician
- Theodore J. St. Antoine (born 1929), American lawyer and legal scholar
- Theodore St. John (1906–1956), American screenwriter
- Theodore Saloutos (1910–1980), American historian
- Theodore Salvesen (1863–1942), Scottish soldier and businessman
- Ted Sampley (1946–2009), American POW/MIA activist
- Theodore M. Sanders (1879–1947), American architect
- Theodore R. Sarbin (1911–2005), American psychologist
- Theodore S. Sayre (1837–1916), American businessman and politician
- Theodore Schatzki, American philosopher
- Theodore Schempp (1904–1988), American painter
- Theodore Schick, American philosopher
- Theodore Schroeder (1864–1953), American lawyer
- Theodore Schultz (1902–1998), American economist
- Theodore Schurch (1918–1946), British Nazi collaborator
- Theodore H. Schwartz (born 1965), American medical scientist
- Theodore Schwan (1841–1926), United States Army Medal of Honor recipient
- Theodore Scott-Dabo (1877–1928), American painter
- Theodore Scowden (1815–1881), American architect
- Theodore C. Search (1841–1920), American businessman
- Theodore L. Sendak (1918–1999), American attorney general
- Theodore Shackley (1927–2002), American CIA officer
- Theodore Shapiro (born 1971), American film composer
- Theodore Shapiro (psychiatrist) (born 1932), American psychiatrist
- T. Leslie Shear (1880–1945), American archaeologist
- Theodore P. Shonts (1855–1919), American lawyer and industrialist
- Theodore Shulman (born 1961), American abortion-rights activist
- Theodore Sider, American philosopher
- Theodore Silverstein (1904–2001), American medieval literature scholar
- Theodore Frelinghuysen Singiser (1845–1907), American politician
- Theodore Cressy Skeat (1907–2003), British academic and librarian
- Theodore Slaman (born 1954), American mathematician
- Theodore J. Smayda (1931–2017), American oceanographer
- Theodore Solomons (1870–1947), American explorer
- Theodore J. Sophocleus (1939–2018), American politician
- Theodore Sorensen (1928–2010), American lawyer, writer, and presidential adviser
- T. E. Sorenson (1853–1929), American farmer and politician
- Theodore Sougiannis, American economist
- Theodore Souris (1925–2002), American judge
- Theodore Southern, American artist and designer
- Theodore Spandounes, Greek historian
- Theodore I. Spaulding (1913–2002), American politician
- Theodore C. Speliotis (born 1953), American politician
- Theodore Spencer (1902–1949), American poet and academic
- Theodore Spicer-Simson (1871–1959), French sculptor and medallist
- Theodore Spiering (1871–1925), American violinist, conductor and teacher
- Theodore Spyropoulos, Greek archaeologist
- Theodore Stanton (1851–1925), American journalist
- Theodore Stearns (1881–1935), American classical composer
- Theodore Stebbins (born 1938), American art historian
- T. C. Steele (1847–1926), American painter
- Theodore Steinmetz (1880–1951), American musician
- Theodore Stephanides (1896–1983), Greek-British doctor and biologist
- Theodore Stephenson (1856–1928), British Army general
- Ted Stevens, American former Senator from Alaska
- Theodore L. Stiles (1848–1925), American judge
- Theodore Strauss (1912–2009), American writer
- Theodore Streleski (born 1936), American murderer
- Theodore Strong (1863–1928), American politician
- Theodore Strongin (1918–1998), American entomologist
- Theodore G. Stroup (born 1940), United States Army general
- Theodore M. Stuart (1883–1946), American football player and coach
- Theodore K. Stubbs (1847–1911), American politician from Pennsylvania
- Theodore Sturgeon (1918–1985), American science fiction author
- Theodore Summerland (1853–1919), American politician
- Theodore Swann (1886–1955), American industrialist
- Theodore Swanson (1873–1959), American farmer and politician
- Theodore Swetz (born 1953), American actor, educator and theatre director
- Theodore Swinarski (1905–1992), American politician and businessman
- Theodore A. Switzler (1828–1879), American military officer
- Theodore Tannenwald Jr. (1916–1999), judge of the United States Tax Court
- Theodore Tapp (1883–1917), English cricketer and British Army officer
- Ted Te, Filipino lawyer
- Theodore Tengerdi (died 1308), Hungarian bishop
- Theodore Theodoridis (born 1965), Greek football official
- Theodore Thring (1816–1891), English cricketer and barrister
- Theodore Tilton (1835–1907), American newspaper editor, poet and abolitionist
- Theodore Timby (1819–1909), American inventor
- Theodore Tinsley (1894–1979), American writer
- Theodore Trautwein (1920–2000), American judge
- Theodore Trautwein (politician) (1869–1955), hotelier, racehorse owner and politician from New South Wales, Australia
- Theodore Ts'o, American computer scientist, free software developer
- Theodore Turnbull, American politician
- Theodore Tylor (1900–1968), British lawyer and international level chess player
- Theodore Friederick Ulrich (1888–1963), Australian Army officer
- Theodore Unmack (1835–1919), Australian politician
- Theodore Ushev (born 1968), Bulgarian animator and filmmaker
- Theodore Van Kirk (1921–2014), American navigator of the Enola Gay
- Theodore Veale (1892–1980), English Victoria Cross recipient
- Theodore Vigé (1867–?), French lepidopterist
- Theodore H. Von Laue, American historian
- Theodore Wachs (born 1941), American psychologist
- Theodore Wade-Gery (1888–1972), British classical scholar
- Theodore Wan (1953–1987), Chinese-Canadian photographer and artist
- Theodore Ward (1902–1983), African-American playwright
- Theodore Wassmer (1910–2006), American painter
- Theodore Watts-Dunton (1832–1914), English critic and poet
- Theodore Weesner (1935–2015), American author
- Theodore Dwight Weld (1803–1895), American abolitionist
- Theodore B. Wells, American architect
- Theodore B. Werner (1892–1989), American politician
- Theodore Wertime (1919–1982), American diplomat and historian
- Theodore S. Westhusing (1960–2005), United States Army officer
- Theodore Wharton (1875–1931), American film director
- Theodore E. White, American paleontologist and zooarchaeologist
- Theodore H. White (1915–1986), American historian and author
- Theodore Whitmarsh (1869–1936), American businessman and politician
- Theodore Whitmore (born 1972), Jamaican footballer and manager
- Theodore Wildanger (1905–1989), French painter
- Theodore Wilhelm (1909–1971), German actor
- Theodore Hartridge Willard, American politician
- Teddy Wilson (1912–1986), American jazz pianist
- Theodore D. Wilson (1840–1896), American naval architect
- Theodore Wilson (1943–1991), American actor
- Theodore H. Winters Jr. (1913–2008), American flying ace during World War II
- Theodore Winthrop (1828–1861), American novelist
- Theodore Blake Wirgman (1848–1925), English painter
- Theodore Wirth (1863–1949), Swiss-born American architect
- Theodore Witcher, American screenwriter and director
- Theodore Wolfner (1864–1929), Hungarian politician
- Theodore Wong (1876–1919), Chinese translator
- Theodore Tuttle Woodruff (1811–1892), American inventor
- Theodore Woods (1874–1932), British bishop
- Theodore Woodward (1914–2005), American medical researcher
- Theodore Dwight Woolsey (1801–1889), American jurist; President of Yale University
- Theodore Salisbury Woolsey (1852–1929), American legal scholar
- Theodore Wores (1859–1939), American painter
- Theodore Sunday Wrobeh (born 1981), Liberian footballer
- Theodore Y. Wu (1924–2023), American engineer
- Theodore Wynsdau (1895–1951), Belgian cyclist
- Theodore Yates (born 1995), Australian bicycle racer
- Theodore O. Yntema (1900–1985), American economist
- Ted Yoho (born 1955), American politician
- Theodore Yuyun (born 1989), Cameroonian footballer
- Theodore Zeldin (born 1933), English historian and academic
- Theodore Zichy (1908–1987), British actor, photographer, film director, producer and playboy
- Theodore Ziolkowski (1932–2020), American scholar
- Guy Theodore Sebastian, Malaysian-Australian singer
- Tewodros II Ge'ez (ዳግማዊ ቴዎድሮስ) (1818–1868), Emperor of Ethiopia from 1855 until his death in 1868

== Disambiguation ==
- Theodore Allen
- Theodore Brinckman
- Theodore Brown
- Theodore Burton
- Theodore Cohen
- Theodore Cole
- Theodore Cook
- Theodore Cottrell
- Theodore Davis
- Theodore Dwight
- Theodore Ellis
- Theodore Frelinghuysen
- Theodore Hill
- Ted Howard
- Theodore Johnson
- Theodore Jones
- Theodore Lewis
- Theodore Long
- Theodore Lyman
- Theodore Morrison
- Theodore Parker
- Theodore Pietsch
- Theodore Richards
- Theodore Robinson
- Theodore Roosevelt
- Theodore Roszak
- Theodore Sedgwick
- Theodore Sizer
- Theodore Smith
- Theodore Soderberg
- Theodore Taylor
- Theodore Thomas
- Theodore Weiss
- Theodore Wilkinson
- Theodore Williams
- Theodore Wright

== Fictional characters ==
- Theodore "Beaver" Cleaver, the title character of Leave It to Beaver
- Theodore "T-Dog" Douglas, character from The Walking Dead
- Theodore Huxtable, character from The Cosby Show
- Theodore Seville, character from Alvin and the Chipmunks

== See also ==
- Saint Theodore (disambiguation)
- Théodore (disambiguation)
- Theodor, a list of people with the given name
- Theodora (disambiguation)
- Theodore (surname)
- Theodoric
- Theodoros, a list of people with the given name Theodoros or Theodorus
- Teodorico, a list of people with the given name Teodorico or Theodorico
- Teodor
- Theodoor
- Fyodor
- Tawadros (disambiguation)
- Tewodros (disambiguation)
- Tudor (disambiguation)
