= Theodoor =

Theodoor (pronounced [ˈteːjoːdoːr]) is a masculine given name. It is the Dutch form of Theodore. Short forms of Theodoor are Theo, Dorus, Dirck, and Dirk. The latter two are derived from the Germanic name Theodoric (via Diederik) rather than from the Greek/Latin Theodorus. People with the name include:

- Theodoor Aenvanck (1633–1690), Flemish painter
- Theodoor Boeyermans (1620–1678), Flemish painter
- Theodoor Jacobus Boks (1893–1961), Dutch mathematician
- Theodoor de Booy (1882–1919), Dutch-born American archaeologist
- Theodoor van Cloon (1684–1735), Governor-General of the Dutch East Indies
- Theodoor Christiaan Adriaan Colenbrander (1841–1930), Dutch architect, ceramist and designer
- Theodoor Doyer (1955–2010), Dutch field hockey player
- Theodoor Galle (1571–1633), Flemish engraver
- Theodoor Gilissen (1858–1918), Dutch banker
- Theodoor Helmbreker (1633–1696), Dutch painter of Italianate landscapes
- Theodoor Willem Jan Juynboll (1802–1861), Dutch Protestant theologian and philologist
- Theodoor Gerard van Lidth de Jeude (1788–1863), Dutch physician, veterinarian, and zoologist
- Theodoor van Loon (1581–1649), Flemish painter
- Theodoor Herman de Meester (1851–1919), Dutch politician, Prime Minister of the Netherlands 1905-1908
- Theodoor Overbeek (1911–2007), Dutch physical chemist
- Theodoor Gautier Thomas Pigeaud (1899–1988), Dutch linguist
- Theodoor van Rijswijck (1811–1849), Flemish writer
- Theodoor Rombouts (1597–1637), Flemish painter
- Theodoor van der Schuer (1634–1707), Dutch painter
- Theodoor Philibert Tromp (1903–1984), Dutch politician and engineer
- Theodoor van Thulden (1606–1669), Dutch painter
- Theodoor van Tulden (died 1645), Dutch law professor
- Theodoor Hendrik van de Velde (1873–1937), Dutch physician and gynæcologist
- Theodoor Verhaegen (1701–1759). Flemish sculptor
- Theodoor Verhey (1848–1929), Dutch composer
- Theodoor Verstraete (1850–1907), Belgian Realist painter
- Theodoor Weustenraad (1805–1849), Dutch poet and publisher
- Theodoor Wilkens (1690–1748, Dutch painter
- Theodoor Johan Arnold van Zijll de Jong (1836–1917), Dutch military leader
- Theodoor Willem van Zuylen van Nievelt (1813–1881), Dutch lawyer and politician

== See also ==
- Theodor
- Théodore (disambiguation)
- Theodora (disambiguation)
- Theodorus (disambiguation)
