= Fedir =

Male given name from Ukraine

Pronunciation of Fedir in Ukrainian

Fedir (Ukrainian: Федір /ˈfɛdjir/ FEHD-ihr) is a masculine Ukrainian name meaning "gift of God" or "God-given" derived from the Ancient Greek name Theodoros.

Common anglicised variants of the name include Teddy and Ted, which are diminutives of Theodore. Common patronymic surnames (from Eastern Slavic naming customs) include Fedoriv, Fedorovych, and Fedorenko for men, as well as Fedorivna for women. Common diminutive nicknames include Fed, Fedya, Fedko, Fedchyk and Fedunchyk.

The Ukrainian name Bohdan is a calque from the same name as Fedir, Theodoros.

== People ==
- Fedir Androshchuk (born 1970), Ukrainian archaeologist
- Fedir Bohatyrchuk (1892–1984), Canadian-Ukrainian chess player
- Fedir Danylak (born 1955), Ukrainian dancer, balletmaster and choreographer
- Fedir Dyachenko (1917–1995), Ukrainian soldier, Hero of the Soviet Union
- Fedir Khodakov (born 1999), Ukrainian drummer
- Fedir Koriatovych (?–1414; r. 1389–1393), Lithuanian prince, ruler of Podolia (in present-day Ukraine)
- Fedir Krychevsky (1879–1947), Ukrainian early modernist painter
- Fedir Kulish (born 2005), Ukrainian figure skater
- Fedir Lashchonov (born 1950), Ukrainian volleyball player
- Fedir Lyzohub (1851–1928), Ukrainian politician
- Fedir Manailo (1910–1978), Ukrainian-Hungarian-Rusyn painter
- Fedir Pirotskyy (1845–1898, Ukrainian-Russian engineer and inventor
- Fedir Rubanov (born 1971), Ukrainian politician
- Fedir Samoilov (born 1998), Ukrainian rock climber
- Fedir Serdiuk (born 1995), Ukrainian entrepreneur
- Fedir Shchus (1893–1921), Ukrainian military commander
- Fedir Shvets (1882–1940), Ukrainian geologist and revolutionary figure
- Fedir Tereshchenko (1888–1950), Ukrainian aircraft designer and industrialist
- Fedir Tetianych (1942–2007), Ukrainian underground artist
- Fedir Vovk (1847–1918), Ukrainian archeologist and anthropologist
- Fedir Zharko (1914–1986), Ukrainian duma singer, Merited Artist of Ukraine

== Historical and regional variants ==
- Федор, Ukrainian
- Хведір, Ukrainian, archaic
- Фёдор, Russian
- Teodor, Polish
- Фёдар, Belarusian

== See also ==
- All pages with titles containing Fedir
- Theodoros
- Theodore (given name)
