= Teodor =

- Gender: Male

Origin
- Origin: Greek

Other names
- Related names: Theodore

Teodor is a masculine given name. In English, it is a cognate of Theodore. Notable people with the name include:

- Teodor Aaron (1803–1867), Romanian Greek Catholic priest and historian
- Teodor Andrault de Langeron (19th century), President of Warsaw
- Teodor Andrzej Potocki (1664–1738), Polish nobleman
- Teodor Anghelini (born 1954), retired Romanian football player and coach
- Teodor Anioła (1925–1993), Polish footballer
- Teodor Atanacković (born 1945), Serbian scientist
- Teodor Atanasiu (born 1962), Romanian engineer and politician
- Teodor Atanasov (born 1987), Macedonian basketball player
- Teodor Axentowicz (1859–1938), Polish painter
- Teodor Axinte (born 2000), Romanian professional footballer
- Teodor Baconschi (born 1963), Romanian politician
- Teodor Bârcă (1894–1993), Moldovan politician
- Teodor Berg Haltvik (born 1999), Norwegian footballer
- Teodor Betting (1827–1892), German piano maker
- Teodor Bieregowoj (1908–1986), Polish racewalker
- Teodor Boldur-Lățescu (19th century), Romanian politician, essayist and newspaper publisher
- Teodor Brateș, Romanian journalist
- Teodor Bujnicki (1907–1944), Polish poet
- Teodor Burada (1839–1923), Romanian ethnographer and musicologist
- Teodor Calmășul (18th century), Romanian boyar
- Teodor Cojocaru (1879–1941), Bessarabian military commander and politician
- Teodor Coman, Romanian former rugby union football player
- Teodor Corban (1957–2023), Romanian actor
- Teodor Currentzis (born 1972), Greek conductor, musician and actor
- Téodor de Wyzewa (1862–1917), French writer, art and music critic, and translator of Polish origin
- Teodor Demetriad (born 1978), Romanian bobsledder
- Teodor Filipović (1778–1807), Serbian lawyer
- Teodor Florian (1899–?), Romanian rugby union player
- Teodor Frunzeti (born 1955), Romanian Land Forces general
- Teodor Gotszalk, Polish scientist
- Teodor Heba (1914–2001), Albanian politician
- Teodor Herța (1891–?), Bessarabian politician
- Teodor Hristov (born 2000), Bulgarian kickboxer
- Teodor Ilić Češljar (1746–1793), Serbian painter
- Teodor Ilincăi (born 1983), Romanian opera tenor
- Teodor Ivanov (born 2004), Bulgarian footballer
- Teodor Janković-Mirijevski (1741–1814), Serbian academic and writer
- Teodor Jełowicki (1828–1905), Polish landowner
- Teodor Kabakchiev (born 1998), Bulgarian motorcycle racer
- Teodor Kazimierz Czartoryski (1704–1768), bishop of Poznań
- Teodor Keko (1958–2002), Albanian writer
- Teodor Kocerka (1927–1999), Polish rower
- Teodor Komogovinski (18th century), Serbian cleric and saint
- Teodor Koskenniemi (1887–1965), Finnish athlete
- Teodor Kračun (18th century), Serbian painter
- Teodor Kubina (1880–1951), Roman Catholic bishop
- Teodor Laço (1936–2016), Albanian writer and diplomat
- Teodor Leszetycki (1830–1915), Polish pianist, teacher and composer
- Teodor Lippmaa (1892–1943), Estonian botanist
- Teodor Lubieniecki (c. 1654–1718), Polish Baroque painter and engraver
- Teodor Lubomirski (1683–1745), Polish nobleman
- Teodor Lucuță (1955–2013), Romanian footballer
- Teodor Lungu (born 1995), Moldovan footballer
- Teodor Marian, Romanian rugby union player
- Teodor Martynyuk (born 1974), Ukrainian Catholic archbishop
- Teodor Matsapula (born 1981), Ukrainian Ruthenian Catholic hierarch
- Teodor Meleșcanu (born 1941), Romanian politician, diplomat and jurist
- Teodor Moraru (1938–2011), contemporary Romanian painter
- Teodor Muzaka (disambiguation), several people
- Teodor T. Nalbant (1933–2011), Romanian ichthyologist
- Teodor Narbutt (1784–1864), Polish-Lithuanian writer, Romanticist historian and military engineer
- Teodor Neaga (1878–1941), Bessarabian politician
- Teodor Negoiță (1947–2011), Romanian polar region explorer
- Teodor Nițulescu (born 1959), Romanian politician
- Teodor Obadal (born 2001), Canadian soccer player
- Teodor Odhner (1879–1928), Swedish zoologist
- Teodor Parnicki (1908–1988), Polish writer
- Teodor Pejačević (1855–1928), Croatian politician
- Teodor Peterek (1910–1969), Polish soccer player
- Teodor Peterson (born 1988), Swedish cross-country skier
- Teodor Pîrjol (born 1957), Romanian boxer
- Teodor Popescu (20th century), Romanian bobsledder
- Teodor Račanin, Serbian writer
- Teodor Regedziński (1894–1954), Polish chess master
- Teodor Rotrekl (1923–2004), Czech illustrator and painter
- Teodor Runsiö (born 1995), Swedish child actor
- Teodor Rus (born 1974), Romanian footballer and manager
- Teodor Rygier (1841–1913), Polish sculptor
- Teodor Salparov (born 1982), Bulgarian volleyball player
- Teodor Shanin (1930–2020), Polish sociologist
- Teodor Shteingel (1870–1946), Ukrainian archaeologist, philanthropist and nationalist politician
- Teodor Siliqi, Albanian chess player
- Teodor Sillman (1854–1926), Finnish politician
- Teodor Skorchev (born 1986), Bulgarian footballer
- Teodor Skuminowicz (died 1668), Lithuanian Roman Catholic prelate
- Teodor Stanca (1933–2023), Romanian engineer and politician
- Teodor V. Ștefanelli (1849–1920), Austrian-born Romanian imperial historian, writer and lawyer
- Teodor Stefanov Gologlavac, Serbian painter
- Teodor Suruceanu, Bessarabian politician
- Teodor Szybiłło, polish politician
- Teodor Talowski (1857–1910), Polish architect
- Teodor Tarnavschi (1859–1914), Romanian Orthodox priest and theology professor
- Teodor Tchipev (born 1940), Bulgarian judge and politician
- Teodor Teodorov (1859–1924), Bulgarian politician
- Teodor Todeski (born 2002), Macedonian handball player
- Teodor Todorov (born 1989), Bulgarian volleyball player
- Teodor Uncu (c. 1887–1940), Bessarabian politician
- Teodor Ussisoo (1878–1959), Estonian interior architect
- Teodor Vârnav (1801–1868), Romanian writer and translator
- Teodor Vasile (born 1947), Romanian cyclist
- Teodor Vaso (1941–2024), Albanian footballer
- Teodor Wålemark (born 2001), Swedish footballer
- Teodor Wieczorek (1923–2009), Polish footballer
- Teodor Wieliszek (1898–1952), Polish footballer
- Teodor Zaczyk (1900–1990), Polish fencer
- Teodor Zgureanu (1939–2024), Moldovan conductor and composer
- Teodor Żychliński (1830–1909), Polish heraldic, diarist, journalist and editor

== See also ==
- Teodor., taxonomic author abbreviation for Emanoil C. Teodorescu (1866–1949), Romanian botanist
- Teodors, a Latvian given name
- Theodor, a German given name
