= Diosdado =

Diosdado, Spanish name meaning "God given" and agnate with Theodore, is the name of:

== Given name ==
- Diosdado Macapagal (1910–1997), President of the Philippines from 1961 to 1965
- Diosdado Cabello (born 1963), Acting President of Venezuela in 2002
- Diosdado Simón (1954–2002), Spanish researcher, biologist, botanist
- Diosdado Macapagal Arroyo (born 1974), son of Philippine President Gloria Macapagal-Arroyo

== Surname ==
- Ana Diosdado (1938–2015), Spanish-Argentinian writer and actress
- Enrique Diosdado (1910–1983), Spanish actor
- Miguel Diosdado (born 1985), Spanish actor
- Nuria Diosdado (born 1990), Mexican Olympic synchronized swimmer

Diosdado Juarez
