= Senator Fairchild =

Senator Fairchild may refer to:

- Edward T. Fairchild (judge) (1872–1965), Wisconsin State Senate
- I. D. Fairchild (1875–1928), Texas State Senate
- Roger Fairchild (born 1953), Idaho State Senate
- Theodore Tracy Fairchild (1865–1950), Nevada State Senate
- William R. Fairchild (1853–1929), Vermont State Senate
