= Teodoras =

- Gender: Male

Origin
- Region of origin: Lithuania

Other names
- Related names: Theodore

Teodoras is a Lithuanian masculine given name. It is a cognate of the name Theodore. People bearing the name Teodoras include:

- Teodoras Četrauskas (1944–2024), Lithuanian writer and literary translator
- Teodoras Daukantas (1884–1960), Lithuanian military officer, former Lithuanian Minister of Defense
- Teodoras Karijotaitis (13??–1414), Ruthenian prince, Lithuanian nobleman
- Teodoras Skuminavičius (16??–1668), Bishop of Vilnius
