= Ted Cohen =

Ted Cohen may refer to:

- Ted Cohen (philosopher) (1939–2014), American philosopher
- Ted Cohen (music industry executive) (born 1949), American digital entertainment industry executive
- Ted Cohen (Florida politician) (1922–2002), member of the Florida House of Representatives
- Teddy Charles (1928–2012, born Theodore Charles Cohen), American jazz musician

== See also ==
- Theodore Cohen (disambiguation)
- Edward Cohen (1822–1877), Australian merchant and politician
