= Dorus (disambiguation) =

Dorus is a figure in Greek mythology, founder of the Dorian nation.

Dorus may also refer to:

- Dorus (mythology), several figures referred to by this name
- Dorus (Crimea), historic fortress in Crimea
- Tom Manders (Dutch artist) or Dorus (1921–1972), Dutch comedian
- Dorus, Greek mythological figure, son of Apollo and Phthia, and the father of Xanthippe

== People with the given name ==
- Dorus Nijland (1880–1968), Dutch cyclist
- Dorus Rijkers (1847–1928), Dutch lifeboat captain
- Dorus de Vries (born 1980), Dutch footballer

== People with the surname ==
- Louis Dorus (1813–1896), French flutist

== See also ==
- Dora (given name)
- Doris (disambiguation)
- Doru (disambiguation)
- Torus (disambiguation)
