= Fedoriv =

Fedoriv (Ukrainian: Фе́дорів, Russian: Фе́дорив), female form Fedoriva (Ukrainian: Фе́доріва, Russian: Фе́дорива) is a Ukrainian patronymic surname, related to the name Fedir. Notable people with this surname include:

- Aleksandra Fedoriva (born 1988), Russian track and field athlete
- Andrey Fedoriv (born 1963), Soviet sprinter
- Iryna Fedoriv (born 2005), Ukrainian canoeist
- Lyudmila Fedoriva (born 1958), Soviet and Russian track and field athlete and coach
- Vitaliy Fedoriv (footballer) (born 1987), Ukrainian football defender
- Vitaliy Fedoriv (born 1977), Ukrainian civil servant and politician
- Volodymyr Fedoriv (born 1985), Ukrainian football defender

== See also ==
- Fyodorov
