= Theodoros =

Theodoros or Theodorus (Greek: Θεόδωρος) is a masculine given name, from which Theodore is derived. The feminine version is Theodora. It may refer to:

== Ancient world ==
Ordered chronologically

- Theodorus of Samos, 6th-century BC Greek sculptor, architect and inventor
- Theodorus of Cyrene, 5th-century BC Libyan Greek mathematician
- Theodorus of Byzantium, late 5th-century BC Greek sophist and orator
- Theodorus the Atheist (c. 340–c. 250 BC), Libyan Greek philosopher
- Theodorus of Athamania (fl. 225 BC), King of a tribe in Epirus
- Theodorus (meridarch) (fl. 100–55 BC), civil governor of the Swat province of the Indo-Greek kingdom
- Theodorus of Gadara, 1st-century BC Greek rhetorician
- Theodorus of Asine (fl. 3rd–4th century), Greek Neoplatonist philosopher
- Theodorus of Tabennese (c. 314–368), Egyptian Christian monk
- Theodorus (usurper) (fl. 372), Roman usurper against Emperor Valens
- Theodorus Priscianus, 4th-century physician at Constantinople
- Theodorus I (bishop of Milan) (died 490)
- Theodorus (consul 505) (fl. 505–523), Roman politician
- Theodorus Lector (fl. 520-530), Byzantine scholar and historian
- Theodore Rshtuni (590-654/655), Armenian nobleman who fought against the first Arab invasions of Armenia
- Theodorus (archbishop of Ravenna) (died 691)
- Pope Theodoros I of Alexandria, 45th Coptic Pope of Alexandria and Patriarch of the See of St. Mark (730–742) (also known as Theodosius II)
- Saint Theodorus (c. 775–c. 842), monk from Jerusalem
- Theodore Balsamon, 12th-century Eastern Orthodox Patriarch of Antioch
- Theodore I Laskaris, Emperor of Nicaea (1204–1221 or 1205–1222)
- Theodore II Laskaris, Emperor of Nicaea (1254–1258)
- Theodore Hyrtakenos (fl. 1300), Byzantine court official and writer
- Theodore II Palaiologos (c. 1396–1448), Despot in the Morea
- Theodoros Pelecanos of Corfu (fl. 1478), Greek scribe

== Modern world ==
Ordered by last name, where available

- Pope Tawadros II of Alexandria (born 1952), current Coptic Pope of Alexandria and Patriarch of the See of St. Mark
- Patriarch Theodore II of Alexandria (born 1954), current Eastern Orthodox Patriarch of Alexandria and all Africa
- Theo Angelopoulos (1935–2012), Greek filmmaker, screenwriter and producer
- Theodorus Bailey (politician) (1758–1828), United States senator from New York
- Theodorus Bailey (officer) (1805–1877), United States Navy rear admiral
- Theodorus W. Brevard (1804–1877), American comptroller
- Theodorus Frederik van Capellen (1762–1824), Dutch naval officer
- Theodorus van der Croon (1668–1739), Dutch Archbishop of Utrecht
- Theodorus Dekker (1927–2021), Dutch mathematician
- Theodoros Deligiannis (1820–1905), Greek politician, five times Prime Minister of Greece
- Theodorus Jacobus Frelinghuysen (c. 1691–c. 1747), German-American minister and theologian
- Theodorus Jacobus Frelinghuysen II (1724–1761), New York theologian
- Theodorus Janssonius van Almeloveen (1657–1712), Dutch physician
- Theodorus Klompe (1903–1963), Dutch geologist
- Theodoros Kolokotronis (1770–1843), Greek general and preeminent leader of the Greek War of Independence
- Theodorus van Kooten (1749–1813), Dutch poet, professor and politician
- Theodorus B. M. Mason (1848–1899), American founder of the Office of Naval Intelligence
- Theodorus Bailey Myers (1821–1888), American collector of books and historical manuscripts
- Theodoros Natsinas (1872–1949), Greek teacher
- Theodoros Negris (1790–1824), Greek politician
- Theodorus Netscher (1661–1728), Dutch painter
- Theodoros G. Orphanides (1817–1886), Greek botanist
- Theodoros Pangalos (general) (1878–1952), Greek general, dictator in 1925–26
- Theodoros Pangalos (politician) (1938–2023), Greek politician, foreign minister and deputy prime minister of Greece
- Theodoros Papagiannis (born 1942), Greek sculptor
- Theodoros Papaloukas (born 1977), Greek basketball player
- Theodorus Marinus Roest (1832–1898), Dutch numismatist
- Theodorus Marinus Roest van Limburg (1806–1887), Dutch journalist, diplomat, and politician
- Theodoros Roussopoulos (born 1963), Greek politician
- Theodorus Johannes Schoon (1915–1985), Dutch-New Zealand artist, photographer and carver
- Theodorus Schrevelius (1572–1649), Dutch writer and poet
- Theodorus Skuminowicz (died 1668), Lithuanian Bishop of Vilnius
- Theodoros Stamos (1922–1997), Greek-American painter
- Theodoros Tripotseris (born 1986), Greek footballer
- Theodoros Tzinis (1798–1869), Greek fighter in the Greek War of Independence
- Theodoros Vasilakakis (born 1988), Greek footballer
- Theodoros Velkos (born 1976), Greek badminton player
- Theodoros Voutiritsas (born 1962), Greek football manager and former player
- Theodoros Vryzakis (1819–1878), Greek painter
- Theodoros Zagorakis (born 1971), Greek politician and former footballer
- Theodoros Ziakas (1798–1882), Greek fighter in the Greek War of Independence

== See also ==
- James Bass Mullinger (1834 or 1843–1917), British author who sometimes used "Theodorus" as a pen name
