= Tedros =

Tedros is an Ethiopian and Eritrean name (cognate to Theodore) that may refer to:

== Given name ==
- Tedros Adhanom Ghebreyesus (born 1965), Ethiopian politician and academic, director-general of the World Health Organization
- Tedros Redae (born 1991), Ethiopian cyclist
- Tedros "Teddy" Teclebrhan (born 1983 in Eritrea), German comedian and actor

== Surname ==
- Abraham Tedros, Eritrean football player
- Garad Hirabu Goita Tedros Al Somali, Somali military commander and general in the Adal Sultanate.

== Fictional ==
- Tedros Pendragon, The School for Good and Evil by Soman Chainani (2013)
- Tedros, The Idol (2023)
