= Teuvo =

- Gender: male
- Language: Finnish
- Name day: 9 November

Origin
- Origin: Theodoros

Other names
- Cognate: Theodore
- Related names: Feodor, Fjodor

Teuvo is a masculine given name predominantly found in Finland. Individuals bearing the name include:

- Teuvo Aura (1912–1999), Finnish politician
- Teuvo Hakkarainen (born 1960), Finnish politician and member of Finnish Parliament
- Teuvo Hatunen (1944–2010), Finnish cross-country skier
- Teuvo Haverinen (born 1964), Finnish darts player
- Teuvo Kohonen, Dr. Ing (1934–2021), Finnish academician and prominent researcher
- Teuvo Länsivuori (born 1945), former Grand Prix motorcycle road racer
- Teuvo Laukkanen (1919–2011), Finnish cross-country skier who competed in the 1940s
- Teuvo Loman (born 1962), Finnish, hairdresser, model and singer living in Helsinki
- Teuvo Moilanen (born 1973), former Finnish football goalkeeper
- Teuvo Ojala (1947–1991), Finnish wrestler
- Teuvo Pakkala (1862–1925), Finnish author, playwright, reporter, linguist and teacher
- Teuvo Peltoniemi (born 1950), Finnish writer, journalist, researcher and eHealth developer
- Teuvo Puro (1884–1956), Finnish actor, writer, and director
- Teuvo Teräväinen (born 1994), Finnish professional ice hockey player
- Teuvo Tulio (1912–2000), Finnish film director and actor
- Teuvo Vilen (born 1953), Finnish footballer
