= Doru =

Doru may refer to:

- Doru (name)
- Doru (earwig), a genus of earwigs
- Doru Shahabad, a town in Anantnag District, Jammu and Kashmir, India
- Dory (spear) or doru, the primary armament of Ancient Greek hoplites
