= Doru (name) =

Doru is a Romanian male name, probably derived from Tudor, the Romanian version of Theodore.

Notable personalities with this name:

- Doru Borobeică, guitarist
- Doru Davidovici (1945–1989), aviator and writer
- Doru Popovici (1932–2019), composer
- Doru-Viorel Ursu (1953–2024), politician
