= Thrasymachus =

5th-century BC Greek sophist

Thrasymachus (/θrəˈsɪməkəs/; Ancient Greek: Θρασύμαχος Thrasýmachos; c. 459 – c. 400 BC) was a sophist of ancient Greece best known as a character in Plato's Republic.

== Life, date, and career ==
Thrasymachus was a citizen of Chalcedon, on the Bosphorus. His career appears to have been spent as a sophist at Athens, although the exact nature of his work and thought is unclear. He is credited with an increase in the rhythmic character of Greek oratory, especially the use of the paeonic rhythm in prose, and a greater appeal to the emotions through gesture.

Aristophanes makes what is the most precisely dateable of references to Thrasymachus, in a passing joke from a lost play dated to 427 BC. Nils Rauhut of the Internet Encyclopedia of Philosophy concludes from this passage that Thrasymachus must have been teaching in Athens for several years before this point. A fragment from Clement of Alexandria provides some further context by contrasting Thrasymachus with the Macedonian Archelaus. "And while Euripides says in the Telephus, 'Shall we who are Greeks be slaves to barbarians?', Thrasymachus says in his speech For the People of Larisa, 'Shall we become slaves to Archelaus, Greeks as we are, to a barbarian?'" Rauhut therefore declares it evident that Thrasymachus became most prominent in the last three decades of the 5th century. Dillon and Gergel posit the alternate possibility that the speech was composed by the 2nd-century AD Herodes Atticus, of whom we have extracts similar in spirit to Clement's fragment, which read as authentically 5th-century, exhibiting detailed knowledge of Thessalian politics.

There is a man by the same name mentioned in Aristotle's Politics who overthrew the democracy at Cyme, but nothing is known of this event, nor can it be said with any degree of certainty that they are the same man. Aristotle mentions a Thrasymachus again in his Sophistical Refutations, where he credits him with a pivotal role in the development of rhetorical theory. Quoting the W. A. Pickard-Cambridge text: "For it may be that in everything, as the saying is 'the first start is the main part' ... This is in fact what has happened in regard to rhetorical speeches and to practically all the other arts: for those who discovered the beginnings of them advanced them in all only a little way, whereas the celebrities of to-day are the heirs (so to speak) of a long succession of men who have advanced them bit by bit, and so have developed them to their present form, Tisias coming next after the first founders, then Thrasymachus after Tisias, and Theodorus next to him, while several people have made their several contributions to it: and therefore it is not to be wondered at that the art has attained considerable dimensions." Dillon and Gergel are cautious not to read this as stating that this makes Thrasymachus a student of Tisias, just as it does not make Theodorus a student of Thrasymachus.

Writing more specifically in the Rhetoric, Aristotle attributes to Thrasymachus a witty simile. "A simile works best when it is in effect a metaphor, for it is possible to say that a shield is like the drinking-cup of Ares, or that a ruin is like the tattered rag of a house, and to say that Niceratus is like a Philoctetes bitten by Pratys – the simile made by Thrasymachus when he saw Niceratus, who had been beaten by Pratys in a recitation competition, still going around with his hair uncut and unkempt." A further reference to Thrasymachus in the Rhetoric finds Herodicus punning on Thrasymachus' name. "Herodicus said of Thrasymachus, 'You are always bold in battle (thrasymakhos)!'" Dillon and Gergel suggest that this might explain Plato's choice of Thrasymachus as the "combative and bombastic propounder of the 'might is right' theory" for his Republic. Against this theory, however, scholar Angie Hobbs suggests that Thrasymachus's intention may be "simply to expose current hypocrisies, rather than to applaud their manipulation".

Plato mentions Thrasymachus as a successful rhetorician in his Phaedrus, but attributes nothing significant to him. The Byzantine Suda gives a brief description of Thrasymachus affirming his position as a rhetorical theorist. "A Chalcedonian sophist, from the Chalcedon in Bithynia. He was the first to discover period and colon, and he introduced the modern kind of rhetoric. He was a pupil of the philosopher Plato and of the rhetor Isocrates. He wrote deliberative speeches; an Art of Rhetoric; paegnia; Rhetorical Resources." Dillon and Gergel state that the second sentence is a "preposterous statement, both as concerns Plato and Isocrates". They further declare that emending 'pupil' (mathêtês) for 'teacher' (kathêgêtês) is equally foolish. They themselves suggest a lacuna in the text, wherein Thrasymachus is declared the pupil of another, and a rival of Plato and Isocrates.

Dionysius of Halicarnassus praises Thrasymachus for various rhetorical skills in his On Isaeus, finding Thrasymachus "pure, subtle, and inventive and able, according as he wishes, to speak either with terseness or with an abundance of words." But Dionysus found Thrasymachus a second-rate orator beside the "incisive" and "charming" Lysias, because he left no forensic speeches to posterity, only handbooks and display-speeches.

== Fragment 1 ==
The essay of Dionysius of Halicarnassus, On the Style of Demosthenes preserves (as an example of the "middle style") the lengthiest surviving fragment of Thrasymachus' writing. It seems to be "the beginning of a political speech, apparently composed for delivery by a young upper-class Athenian of conservative sympathies" and "was probably composed in the early 420s."

I could wish, men of Athens, to have belonged to that long-past time when the young were content to remain silent unless events compelled them to speak, and while the older men were correctly supervising affairs of State. But since Fate has so far advanced us in time that we must obey others as rulers but must suffer the consequences ourselves; and when the worst results are not the work of Heaven or Fate but of our administrators, then it is necessary to speak. A man either has no feeling, or has too much patience, if he is willing to go on offering himself up to whoever wishes as the object of their mistakes, and is ready to take on himself the blame for the guile and wickedness of others.

No, the past is enough for us—that we have exchanged peace for war, reaching the present through dangers, so that we regard the past with affection and the future with fear; and that we have sacrificed concord for enmity and internal disturbance. Others are driven to excesses and civil strife through a surfeit of prosperity; but we behaved soberly in our prosperity. We were seized with madness at a time of adversity, which usually makes others act soberly. Why then should anyone delay to say what he knows, if he happens to feel grief at the present state of affairs, and to believe that he has a means of bringing this to an end?

First of all, therefore, I shall prove in my speech that those of the orators and others who are at variance are mutually experiencing something that is bound to befall those who engage in senseless rivalry: believing that they are expressing opposite views, they fail to perceive that their actions are the same, and that the theory of the opposite party is inherent in their own theory. For consider from the beginning what each party is seeking.

In the first place, the 'ancestral constitution' is a cause of dissension between them, though it is easiest to grasp and is the common property of all citizens. Whatever lies outside our knowledge must necessarily be learnt from earlier generations, but whatever the elder generation has itself witnessed, we can find out from those who know. (85B1 DK, trans. Freeman)

== In Plato ==
Thrasymachus' current importance derives mainly from his being a character in the Republic. He is noted for his unabashed, even reckless, defence of his position and for his famous blush at the end of Book I, after Socrates delivered his final refutation. The meaning of this blush, like that of Socrates' statement in Book 6 that he and Thrasymachus "have just become friends, though we weren't even enemies before" (498c), is a source of some dispute.

There is a long philosophical tradition of exploring what exactly Thrasymachus meant in Republic I, and of taking his statements as a coherent philosophical assertion, rather than as Plato's straw man.

In Republic I, Thrasymachus violently disagreed with the outcome of Socrates' discussion with Polemarchus about justice. Demanding payment before speaking, he claims that "justice is the advantage of the stronger" (338c) and that "injustice, if it is on a large enough scale, is stronger, freer, and more masterly than justice" (344c). Socrates counters by forcing him to admit that there is some standard of wise rule — Thrasymachus does claim to be able to teach such a thing — and then arguing that this suggests a standard of justice beyond the advantage of the stronger. The rest of the dialogue is occasioned by Glaucon's dissatisfaction with Socrates' refutation.

His name means fierce fighter, which may have influenced his role in the dialogue.

In Leo Strauss's interpretation, Thrasymachus and his definition of justice represent the city and its laws, and thus are in a sense opposed to Socrates and to philosophy in general. As an intellectual, however, Thrasymachus shared enough with the philosopher potentially to act to protect philosophy in the city.

=== Quotes from Plato's Republic ===
338c:

Ἄκουε δή, ἦ δ᾽ ὅς. φημὶ γὰρ ἐγὼ εἶναι τὸ δίκαιον οὐκ ἄλλο τι ἢ τὸ τοῦ κρείττονος συμφέρον.

Listen—I say that justice is nothing other than the advantage of the stronger.

— Plato, Republic, 338c

340d:

ἐπεὶ αὐτίκα ἰατρὸν καλεῖς σὺ τὸν ἐξαμαρτάνοντα περὶ τοὺς κάμνοντας κατ᾽ αὐτὸ τοῦτο ὃ ἐξαμαρτάνει; ἢ λογιστικόν, ὃς ἂν ἐν λογισμῷ ἁμαρτάνῃ, τότε ὅταν ἁμαρτάνῃ, κατὰ ταύτην τὴν ἁμαρτίαν; ἀλλ᾽ οἶμαι λέγομεν τῷ ῥήματι οὕτως, ὅτι ὁ ἰατρὸς ἐξήμαρτεν καὶ ὁ λογιστὴς ἐξήμαρτεν καὶ ὁ γραμματιστής: τὸ δ᾽ οἶμαι ἕκαστος τούτων, καθ᾽ ὅσον τοῦτ᾽ ἔστιν ὃ προσαγορεύομεν αὐτόν, οὐδέποτε ἁμαρτάνει: ὥστε κατὰ τὸν ἀκριβῆ λόγον, ἐπειδὴ καὶ σὺ ἀκριβολογῇ, οὐδεὶς τῶν δημιουργῶν ἁμαρτάνει. ἐπιλειπούσης γὰρ ἐπιστήμης ὁ ἁμαρτάνων ἁμαρτάνει, ἐν ᾧ οὐκ ἔστι δημιουργός: ὥστε δημιουργὸς ἢ σοφὸς ἢ ἄρχων οὐδεὶς ἁμαρτάνει τότε ὅταν ἄρχων ᾖ, ἀλλὰ πᾶς γ᾽ ἂν εἴποι ὅτι ὁ ἰατρὸς ἥμαρτεν καὶ ὁ ἄρχων ἥμαρτεν.

Why, to take the nearest example, do you call one who is mistaken about the sick a physician in respect of his mistake or one who goes wrong in a calculation a calculator when he goes wrong and in respect of this error? Yet that is what we say literally—we say that the physician erred and the calculator and the schoolmaster. But the truth, I take it, is, that each of these in so far as he is that which we entitle him never errs; so that, speaking precisely, since you are such a stickler for precision, no craftsman errs. For it is when his knowledge abandons him that he who goes wrong goes wrong—when he is not a craftsman. So that no craftsman, wise man, or ruler makes a mistake then when he is a ruler, though everybody would use the expression that the physician made a mistake and the ruler erred.

— Plato, Republic, 340d

344c:

οὕτως, ὦ Σώκρατες, καὶ ἰσχυρότερον καὶ ἐλευθεριώτερον καὶ δεσποτικώτερον ἀδικία δικαιοσύνης ἐστὶν ἱκανῶς γιγνομένη, καὶ ὅπερ ἐξ ἀρχῆς ἔλεγον, τὸ μὲν τοῦ κρείττονος συμφέρον τὸ δίκαιον τυγχάνει ὄν, τὸ δ᾽ ἄδικον ἑαυτῷ λυσιτελοῦν τε καὶ συμφέρον.

Thus, Socrates, injustice on a sufficiently large scale is a stronger, freer, and a more masterful thing than justice, and, as I said in the beginning, it is the advantage of the stronger that is the just, while the unjust is what profits man's self and is for his advantage.

— Plato, Republic, 344c
