= Theodore Friederick Ulrich =

Australian Army officer (1888–1963)

- Born: 10 December 1888; Ararat, Victoria
- Died: 12 December 1963 (aged 75); Brunswick, Victoria
- Military career
- Allegiance: Australia
- Branch: Citizens Military Force
- Service years: 1911–45
- Commands: 12th Garrison Battalion (1939–45); 22nd Battalion (1926); 29th Battalion (1921–26); 5/6th Infantry Regiment (1919–21); 6th Battalion (1918–19)
- Conflicts: First World War; Second World War
- Awards: Distinguished Service Order & Bar; Mentioned in Despatches (3); Colonial Auxiliary Forces Officers' Decoration

Theodore Friederick Ulrich, DSO & Bar, VD (10 December 1888 – 12 December 1963) was an Australian officer in the First Australian Imperial Force during the First World War. Born in Ararat, Victoria to a family of German ancestry, he spent his childhood in Melbourne and early adult life employed as a clerk for a firm under the ownership of Sir Charles Wellington Connibere. In 1911 he enlisted in the Citizens Military Force, serving in the 1st Battalion of the 6th Australian Infantry Regiment until 1912 when he transferred to the East Melbourne Regiment.

Ulrich was shipped out to Egypt as a lieutenant in October 1914. In April 1915 he landed at Gallipoli and was promoted to captain two days later. He succumbed to illness in November and was evacuated, recuperating until February 1916 whereupon he deployed in France as a major, and shortly after a brigade major. He was awarded the Distinguished Service Order during the Battle of the Somme as well as being mentioned in dispatches. He took command of a battalion in July 1917, and was wounded at the Battle of Ypres in October that year but needed only a few days to recuperate.

In April 1918 his assumed command as a temporary lieutenant colonel after his superior officer was killed. He led his command at the Battle of Lihons and the Battle of Herleville Wood where he received a Bar to his Distinguished Service Order, and was twice more mentioned in dispatches.

Ulrich was returned to Australia in 1919 and placed in command of militia units. He moved into business as a butcher and was married. He remained in civilian life until the outbreak of the Second World War where he was given command of an Australian-based garrison until 1945 when he retired once more to business.
