= Theodore Tuttle Woodruff =

American inventor (1811–1892)

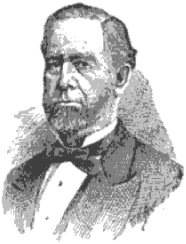
- Born: April 8, 1811; Jefferson County, New York, U.S.
- Died: May 2, 1892 (aged 81); Philadelphia, Pennsylvania, U.S.
- Occupation: Inventor
- Spouse: Eliza Lord Hemenway (m. 1833)
- Children: 2

Theodore Tuttle Woodruff (April 8, 1811 – May 2, 1892) was an American inventor who was an early developer of sleeping cars.

Born in New York State, Woodruff became a wagon maker at a young age before working on railroad cars in Massachusetts. It is through his work on cars that led to Woodruff's invention of the Woodruff sleeping car, which entered operation in 1858. It is in this position that Woodruff was an early competitor to George Pullman and his company up until Pullman purchased Woodruff's company and patents in 1889. Woodruff also invented a coffee-hulling machine, a surveyor's compass and a steam plow.

== Biography ==
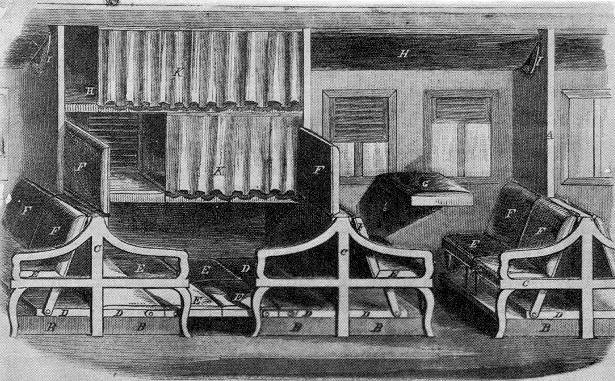
Interior of the Woodruff sleeping car, published in the Scientific American Magazine in 1858.

Theodore Tuttle Woodruff was born in Jefferson County, New York on April 8, 1811. At age 16, he left his family farm to pursue an apprenticeship in wagon-making. After three years as a wagon maker, Woodruff began to learn pattern making at a foundry. With this skill, he became a journeyman who worked in Springfield, Massachusetts on railroad cars. He married Eliza Lord Hemenway on July 25, 1833, and they had two children.

In around 1855 at Alton, Illinois, Woodruff became the Master Car Builder for the Terre Haute, Alton & St. Louis Railroad company. On December 2, 1856, he received two patents for a convertible car seat. Following this, Woodruff relocated back to Springfield to create a new car utilising the convertible car seats built by T.W. Wason & Co. Woodruff's new design, the T.T. Woodruff's sleeping car, divided the car into sections with permanently fixed pairs of seats facing each other. The design then had a lower and middle berth (bunk) produced by a particular arrangement of pivoted seat cushions, while the upper berth was created by hinged frames that folded against the wall during the day. All berths had curtains that could be hung at night.

Woodruff's new sleeping car was first used on the New York Central Railroad in 1858, which Woodruff personally managed. Whilst in New York, he met Andrew Carnegie, who at this point was employed by the Pennsylvania Railroad. It is through Carnegie that Woodruff was introduced to the Pennsylvania Railroad's superintendent, Thomas A. Scott, who encouraged him to form his own company that would build and operate the Woodruff cars. Under the T.T. Woodruff & Company, with Carnegie as one of its investors, the cars were adopted by the Pennsylvania Railroad for its Philadelphia-Pittsburgh Route. By the end of 1858, the Woodruff sleeping car was in service by eight midwestern railroads including the Michigan Central.

When the Central Transportation Company (CTC) was established in 1862, Woodruff became its principal stockholder while his older brother, Jonah (1809-1876), became its manager. All of Woodruff's patents were subsequently assigned to the company and he retired in 1864. After a patent infringement suit with the Pullman Company, many of the CTC's patents were assigned to Pullman. In early 1889, the CTC was purchased by Pullman not long after it joined the Union Palace Car Company in 1888.

Woodruff lost most of his fortune in the Panic of 1873. He was killed when he was struck by a train in Philadelphia on May 2, 1892.

== Legacy ==
One of Woodruff's descendants was the 20th-century diplomat Charles Woodruff Yost.

== See also ==
- Andrew Carnegie
