= Theodore Soderberg =

Theodore Soderberg may refer to:

- Theodore Soderberg (1890–1971), American sound engineer
- Theodore Soderberg (1923–2012), American sound engineer
