= Theodore Burton =

Theodore Burton may refer to:

- Theodore E. Burton (1851–1929), American politician from the state of Ohio
- Theodore M. Burton (1907–1989), American leader in The Church of Jesus Christ of Latter-day Saints
