= Theodore W. Greig =

American Civil War Medal of Honor recipient

- Born: March 13, 1843; New York
- Died: November 17, 1893 (aged 50)
- Burial place: Bronx, New York
- Military career
- Allegiance: United States
- Branch: United States Army
- Rank: Second Lieutenant
- Units: Company C, 61st New York Volunteer Infantry Regiment
- Conflicts: American Civil War; Battle of Antietam
- Awards: Medal of Honor

Theodore W. Greig (March 13, 1843 – November 17, 1893) was a Union Army soldier in the American Civil War who received the U.S. military's highest decoration, the Medal of Honor.

Greig was born in New York on March 13, 1843. He was awarded the Medal of Honor for extraordinary heroism shown at the Battle of Antietam on September 17, 1862, while serving as a Second Lieutenant with Company C, 61st New York Volunteer Infantry Regiment. His Medal of Honor was issued on February 10, 1887.

Greig died at the age of 50 on November 17, 1893, and was buried at Woodlawn Cemetery in Bronx, New York.

== Medal of Honor citation ==
The President of the United States of America, in the name of Congress, takes pleasure in presenting the Medal of Honor to Second Lieutenant Theodore W. Greig, United States Army, for extraordinary heroism on 17 September 1862, while serving with Company C, 61st New York Infantry, in action at Antietam, Maryland. A Confederate regiment, the 4th Alabama Infantry (Confederate States of America), having planted its battle flag slightly in advance of the regiment, Second Lieutenant Greig rushed forward and seized it, and, although shot through the neck, retained the flag and brought it within the Union lines.
