= Theodor =

- Pronunciation: German: [ˈteːodoːɐ̯]
- Gender: Male

Origin
- Origin: Greek

Other names
- Related names: Theodore, Teodor

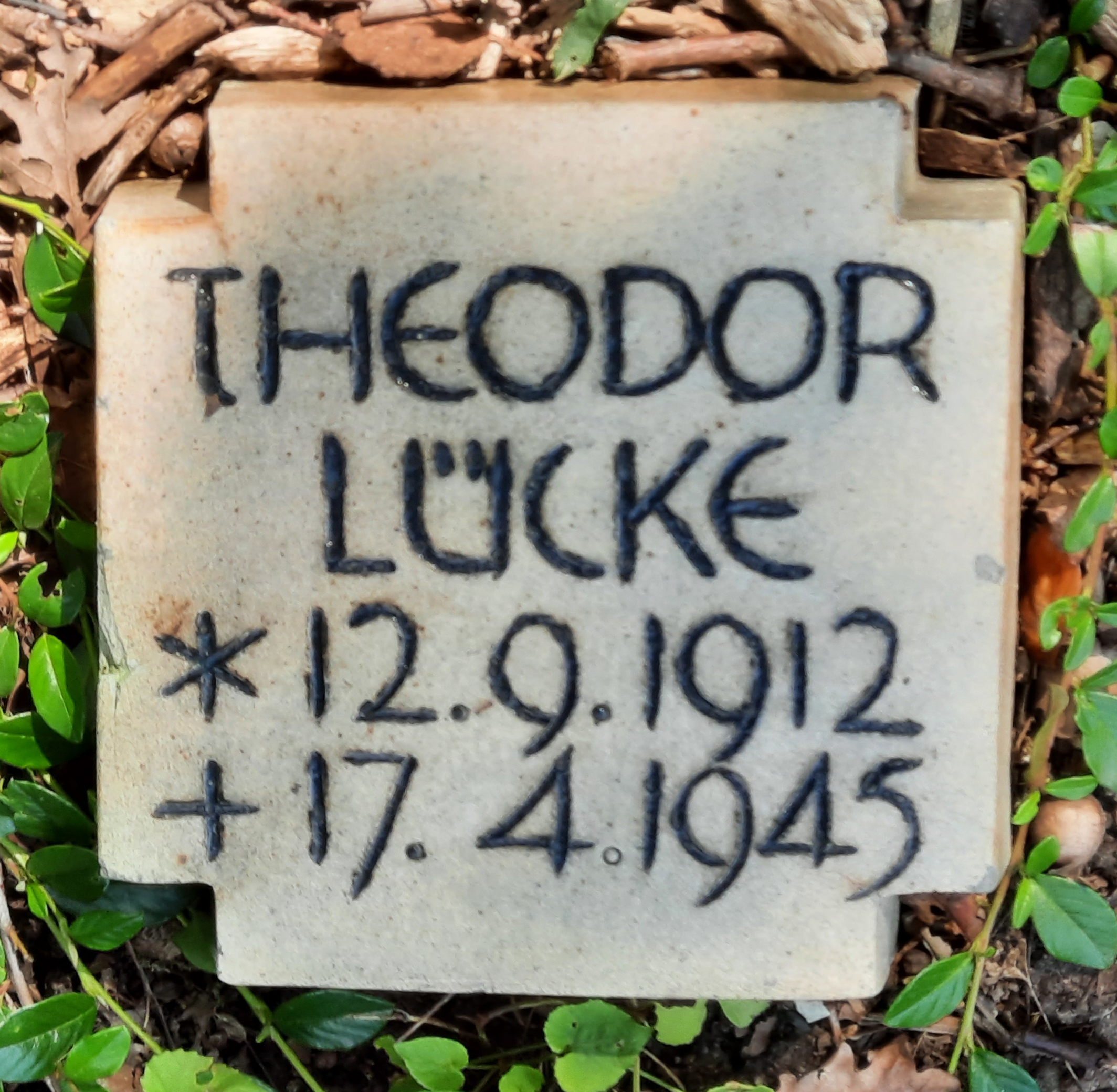
War memorial in the Neuendettelsau cemetery for Theodor Lücke

Theodor is a masculine given name. It is a German form of Theodore. It is also a variant of Teodor. Notable people with the name include:

- Theodor W. Adorno (1903–1969), German philosopher, musicologist, and social theorist
- Theodor Aman, Romanian painter
- Theodor Barth (1849–1909), German politician and publicist
- Theodor Blueger, Latvian professional ice hockey forward for the Pittsburgh Penguins of the National Hockey League (NHL)
- Theodor Burghele, Romanian surgeon, President of the Romanian Academy
- Theodor Busse, German general during World War I and World War II
- Theodor Cazaban, Romanian writer
- Theodor Eicke, German SS general
- Theodor Evertz (fl. c. 1554), Franco-Flemish composer
- Theodor Fischer (fencer), German Olympic épée and foil fencer
- Theodor Fontane (1819–1898), German writer
- Theodor Seuss Geisel, American writer and cartoonist, known by the pseudonym Dr. Seuss
- Theodor W. Hänsch (born 1941), German physicist
- Theodor Herzl (1860–1904), Austrian-Hungary Jewish journalist and the founder of modern political Zionism
- Theodor Heuss (1884–1963), German politician and publicist
- Theodor Innitzer (1875–1955), Austrian Catholic cardinal
- Theodor Kittelsen (1857–1914), Norwegian painter and illustrator
- Teddy Kollek (1911–2007), mayor of Jerusalem from 1965 to 1993
- Emil Theodor Kocher, Swiss medical researcher, recipient of the Nobel Prize in Physiology or Medicine
- Theodor Körner (Austrian politician) (1873–1957), President of Austria from 1951 to 1957
- Theodor Körner (German politician) (1941–2018), German jurist and politician
- Theodor Mommsen (1817–1903), German writer and historian, Nobel Prize in Literature 1902 laureate
- Theodor Holm Nelson, American pioneer of information technology, philosopher of computer science, and sociologist, known as Ted Nelson
- Theodor Paleologu, Romanian politician
- Theodor Pallady, Romanian painter
- Theodor Reuss, German occultist, freemason, illuminati, martinist, rosicrucian, theosophist, journalist, singer and founder of Ordo Templi Orientis
- Theodor Rosetti, Romanian politician
- Theodor Șerbănescu, Romanian poet
- Theodor S. Slen (1885–1986), American judge, lawyer, and politician
- Theodor Stolojan, Romanian politician
- Theodor George Henry Strehlow, Australian anthropologist and linguist, known as Ted Strehlow
- Theodor Svedberg, Swedish chemist, Nobel Prize in Chemistry laureate
- Theodor Zwinger, Swiss scholar
- Theodor Jan Haraldsson, known by his stage name Theoz, Swedish influencer and singer

== See also ==
- Theodore (name)
- Teodor
