= Theodore Frelinghuysen (disambiguation) =

Theodore Frelinghuysen (1787–1862) was an American politician.

Theodore Frelinghuysen may also refer to:

- Theodorus Jacobus Frelinghuysen (c. 1691–c. 1747), German-American Dutch-Reformed minister, theologian and the progenitor of the Frelinghuysen family in the USA
- Theodorus Jacobus Frelinghuysen II (1724–1759) or Theodorus Frelinghuysen, Jr., theologian in Albany, New York
- Theodore Frelinghuysen Seward (1835–1902) American musician and New Thought Christian writer in New York and New Jersey
- Theodore Frelinghuysen (New York socialite) (1860–1931), member of New York Society during the Gilded Age
