= Teodor Gotszalk =

Polish scientist (1966–2025)

Teodor Paweł Gotszalk (20 June 1966 – 21 November 2025) was a Polish scientist who was head of Department of Nanometrology at Wrocław University of Science and Technology. He was also a corresponding member of Polish Academy of Sciences from 2022. Teodor Gotszalk worked in the area of nanotechnology and nanometrology, particularly scanning probe microscopy (SPM), scanning electron microscopy (SEM) and focused ion beam (FIB) techniques, and using microelectromechanical systems (MEMS).

== Career ==
Gotszalk was a Head of Department of Nanometrology at the Wrocław University of Science and Technology's Faculty of Microsystem Electronics and Photonics from 2006. After then, he chaired the first Polish team focused on comprehensive metrology of micro- and nanostructures. The studies combined scanning probe microscopy, scanning electron microscopy and focused ion beam (SPM, SEM and FIB) techniques together with measurements of electrical, thermal, diffractive and optical properties of the structures.

He was a corresponding member of the Polish Academy of Sciences from 2022.

== Personal life and death ==
Gotszalk was the son of Krystyna and Ryszard Gotszalk. He was married to Magdalena Cisek-Gotszalk, and was the father of Anna Kotowska. His niece is Marta Leśniak, former professional tennis player.

Teodor Gotszalk died on 21 November 2025, at the age of 59.

== Grants and awards ==
Awardee of the German Academic Exchange Service (DAAD) (30 months), Fulbright Program (4 months at the University at Albany, SUNY's College of Nanoscience and Engineering in 2010) and Kosciuszko Foundation (3 months at the University of California, Berkeley, 2022).
