= Theodore Czebotar =

American painter

Theodore "Ted" Czebotar
- Born: Thaddeus Czebotar; October 28, 1915; Milwaukee, Wisconsin
- Died: July 28, 1996 at age 80; Fishkill, New York
- Style: Realist Modernism
- Movement: Regionalism
- Spouse: Elizabeth "Els" Snapper (1917–1996) m. January 9, 1952

Theodore "Ted" Czebotar (October 28, 1915, Milwaukee, Wisconsin – July 28, 1996, Fishkill, New York) was an American Regionalist painter active in Wisconsin and New York in the mid-20th century.

== Early life ==
Czebotar was born Thaddeus in Milwaukee, Wisconsin, on October 28, 1915, to Polish immigrant parents John Czebotar and Stella Sienkiewicz. He was the second child born, but the couple would go on to have six sons and two daughters. The family moved often, going from city to farms and back again, eventually settling in Racine, Wisconsin.

In 1933, John Dillinger spent the night in the Czebotar bathtub before robbing the American Bank and Trust in downtown Racine. Dillinger had a connection to Whitey Czebotar, Ted's older brother.

Czebotar dropped out of high school in 1934, after a falling-out with his influential art teacher Helen Sawyer. He jumped a boxcar heading west and met up with his friend Charles "Chuk" Lange in Spokane. The pair traveled the west coast by hopping railcars, ending back in their hometown in March 1935.

== Career ==
When Czebotar returned to Racine, he began to send cartoons to The New Yorker, but after receiving a rejection letter, Czebotar hopped another train west and headed for Denver. Here he lived in a hobo camp for four months, before befriending artist Paschal Quackenbush. Quackenbush was painting murals in public buildings in Denver through the WPA, and hired Czebotar to be his assistant on the project. Through this connection, Czebotar was able to become a Scenic Artist at the Baker Federal Theatre in Denver, another WPA project, in January 1936, and rented "Rock House" in the Rocky Mountains from Quackenbush as a live in studio during that summer. Czebotar moved to San Francisco with Lange in late 1936, where the pair befriended writer William Saroyan. Czebotar sold portraits and sketches in the park to help get by.

Czebotar was badly injured in a car accident in 1937, becoming bedridden. He returned to Racine and sketched and painted the landscape there, in addition to reworking sketches he had made on his travels in the West. After recovering, Czebotar took his work to artist John Steuart Curry for evaluation. He had met Curry at an art show at the Milwaukee Art Institute in February 1937. Curry encouraged Czebotar to move to New York, writing a letter of introduction to his dealer and agent Maynard Walker for Czebotar once he arrived in the city.

Walker immediately took Czebotar on, selling a few of his sketches, and giving Czebotar his first one-man show at Walker's gallery from December 20, 1937 – January 8, 1938. The show was praised in several New York newspapers, including the New York Times and The New Yorker, and even traveled to exhibit at the Milwaukee Art Institute, then later to Hollywood, California. Czebotar sold the majority of the works in the show, with over 40 different collectors and galleries purchasing at least one. Czebotar would be represented in several more shows around New York City through the rest of 1938.

Despite his New York success, Czebotar left the city and returned to Racine that summer, eventually following his old friend Lange to New Orleans by the fall of 1938. He would travel between the cities for the next few years, using the different locations and people as inspiration for his art. Walker continued to show Czebotar's work in exhibits he organized across the country, from California to New York and Boston.

1941 finally saw Czebotar return to New York, splitting his time between the City and Racine that year. He had his second one-man show at Walker's gallery in March 1941, and another in New Orleans which featured more than 40 watercolors. Walker closed his gallery later in 1941, for the duration of World War II, but Czebotar had begun to make a new circle of artistic friends in the city, including Don and Lydia Freeman, Al Hirschfeld, and old friend William Saroyan. In Racine, Czebotar was included in the opening exhibit at the new Wustum Museum of Fine Art, and even agreed to teach a class there in early 1942.

Czebotar returned to New York permanently in early 1942. Although he had no luck exhibiting his work due to the war, he continued to expand his circle of friends. It was through this that he met Elizabeth "Els" Snapper, a Dutch immigrant working as a hat maker, and the pair unofficially married in 1943. When mutual friend and artist Joe Jones was drafted into the service, the couple moved into his "shack" in Fishkill, New York, in order for Czebotar to focus on his art. The couple would spend the rest of their lives living there.

Despite Els' best efforts to secure more exhibitions for him, after 1943, Czebotar was content to simply remain in Fishkill and create more works. Snapper family money supported the couple as there was little to no income from art. Czebotar had an exhibit was at the American British Art Center (ABAC) from January 3–13, 1945, and he was not happy about having to leave Fishkill for it.

Czebotar exhibited his work in a few different shows in New York and Chicago through the next two years, including another one man show at ABAC February 17 – March 8, 1947. In the late 1940s, he became increasingly disillusioned with the commercial art world, declaring he would paint what he liked regardless of what might sell. Czebotar exhibited a piece in his final show in 1957, in the Twenty-fifth Biennial Exhibition of Contemporary American Oil Paintings at the Corcoran Gallery of Art in Washington, D.C.

== Later life ==
Czebotar spent the last decades of his life traveling the continental United States with his wife Els, sketching as he went. His favorite places were the Southwest and Pacific Northwest, especially the Olympic Peninsula. He would then take his sketches back to Fishkill, where he would expand on them obsessively in oils, pastels, and watercolors. Els was also often his muse, and he would create multiple portraits of her over the years.

He also had a few mistresses in his later years, including Louise Sokowski, with whom Els also created a friendship.

By the 1990s, Czebotar was only creating sporadically, but he still did not part with his pieces. He died from poor health at his home in Fishkill on July 28, 1996, at age 80, only a few months after Els.

== Personality and views ==
Czebotar was notoriously difficult to work with, often burning bridges with influential people in the art world. Before his first one-man show in New York, Czebotar wrote a letter to John Steuart Curry telling him of the opportunity. Their relationship was never the same as Curry felt Czebotar did not thank him well enough for introducing Czebotar to Maynard Walker. Walker also struggled with the artist, writing to Curry: "As you say he is an egocentric person and it is hard to get along with such people."

Czebotar was also considered by some to be a misogynist. Asked to explain a comment he made stating women could not paint, he clarified that he felt the art world too demanding for women. He wrote, "A woman can shoot a gun as well as a man yet war is a man's little game. Painting, perhaps, is man's little game too, no matter how badly he does it."

== Works ==
Czebotar's paintings are represented in various collections including the Museum of Wisconsin Art, Racine Art Museum, and Miller Art Museum.

- Main Street in the Midwest
- Central Park Afternoon
- A Study of Els (1942)
- Giant Saguaro (1947)
- The Supplicant
