= Theodore Cottrell =

Theodore Cottrell may refer to:

- Ted Cottrell (Theodore John Cottrell, born 1947), American football coach and former player
- T. J. Cottrell (Theodore John Cottrell Jr., born 1982), his son, American former football tight end
