= Theodore Lyman =

Theodore Lyman may refer to:

- Theodore B. Lyman (1815–1893), American bishop
- Theodore Lyman I (1753–1839), American merchant and shipbuilder
- Theodore Lyman II (1792–1849), American philanthropist, politician, and author
- Theodore Lyman III (1833–1897), American natural scientist, military staff officer, and politician
- Theodore Lyman IV (1874–1954), American physicist
