= Theodore Cohen =

Theodore Cohen may refer to:

- Theodore Cohen (designer) (fl. 2000), American exhibition designer
- Theodore Cohen (chemist) (circa 1930 – 2017, American chemist
- Teddy Charles (born Theodore Charles Cohen, 1928–2012), American jazz musician

== See also ==
- Ted Cohen (disambiguation)
