= Teodors =

Male given name

- Gender: Male
- Name day: 9 November

Origin
- Region of origin: Latvia

Other names
- Related names: Theodore

Teodors is a Latvian masculine given name. It is a cognate of the name Theodore. People bearing the name Teodors include:

- Teodors Bergs (1902–1966), Latvian chess master
- Teodors Bļugers (born 1994), Latvian ice hocker player
- Teodors Eniņš (1934–2008), Latvian neurosurgeon and politician
- Teodors Grīnbergs (1870–1962), Latvian prelate of the Evangelical Lutheran Church of Latvia and first Archbishop of Riga
- Teodors Spāde (1891–1970), Latvian naval officer
- Teodors Sukatnieks (1894–unknown) Latvian track and field athlete
- Teodors Ūders (1868–1915), Latvian artist
