= Diosdado Simón =

Diosdado Simón Villares (Torremenga, 15 October 1954 - Cáceres, 28 April 2002) was a Spanish researcher, biologist, botanist, tree surgeon and environmental teacher.

He studied Biology in UCM, and investigated Extremaduran vegetation. He was the manager of Cáceres' parks and gardens and a member of ADENEX. This association paid him a tribute in 2003 when they gave his name to their price ADENEX- Diosdado Simón.

He died of lung cancer in 2002 when he was preparing the exhibition of orchids Por huevos (by eggs, Orchis means testis in Latin). He was married to the lawyer Dolores Neria and they had two children.

Cáceres City Council gave his name to a garden he designed, Jardín Diosdado Simón, which is located between the museums, Museo de Pedrilla and Museo de Guayasamín, which hosted his last exhibition Por huevos.

== Bibliography ==
- Cáceres verde : el paseo de Cánovas, Diosdado Simón Villares, Jose María Corrales Vázquez

Badajoz : Institución Cultural El Brocense, 2001. ISBN 84-95239-25-6

- Árboles Notables de Extremadura, Diosdado Simón Villares, ADENEX, 1999
