= Theodore Morrison =

Theodore Morrison may refer to:

- Theodore N. Morrison (1850–1929), American bishop
- T. H. Morrison, American librarian and college football player and coach
- Theodore Morrison (composer), composer of 2013 opera Oscar

== See also ==
- Theodore Morison (1863–1936), British educationalist
