= Theodore Pietsch =

Theodore Pietsch may refer to:

- Theodore Wells Pietsch I (1868–1930), American architect
- Theodore Wells Pietsch II (1912–1993), American automobile stylist and industrial designer
- Theodore Wells Pietsch III (born 1945), American ichthyologist
