= Theodore Gilman (banker) =

American banker and reform advocate (1841–1930)

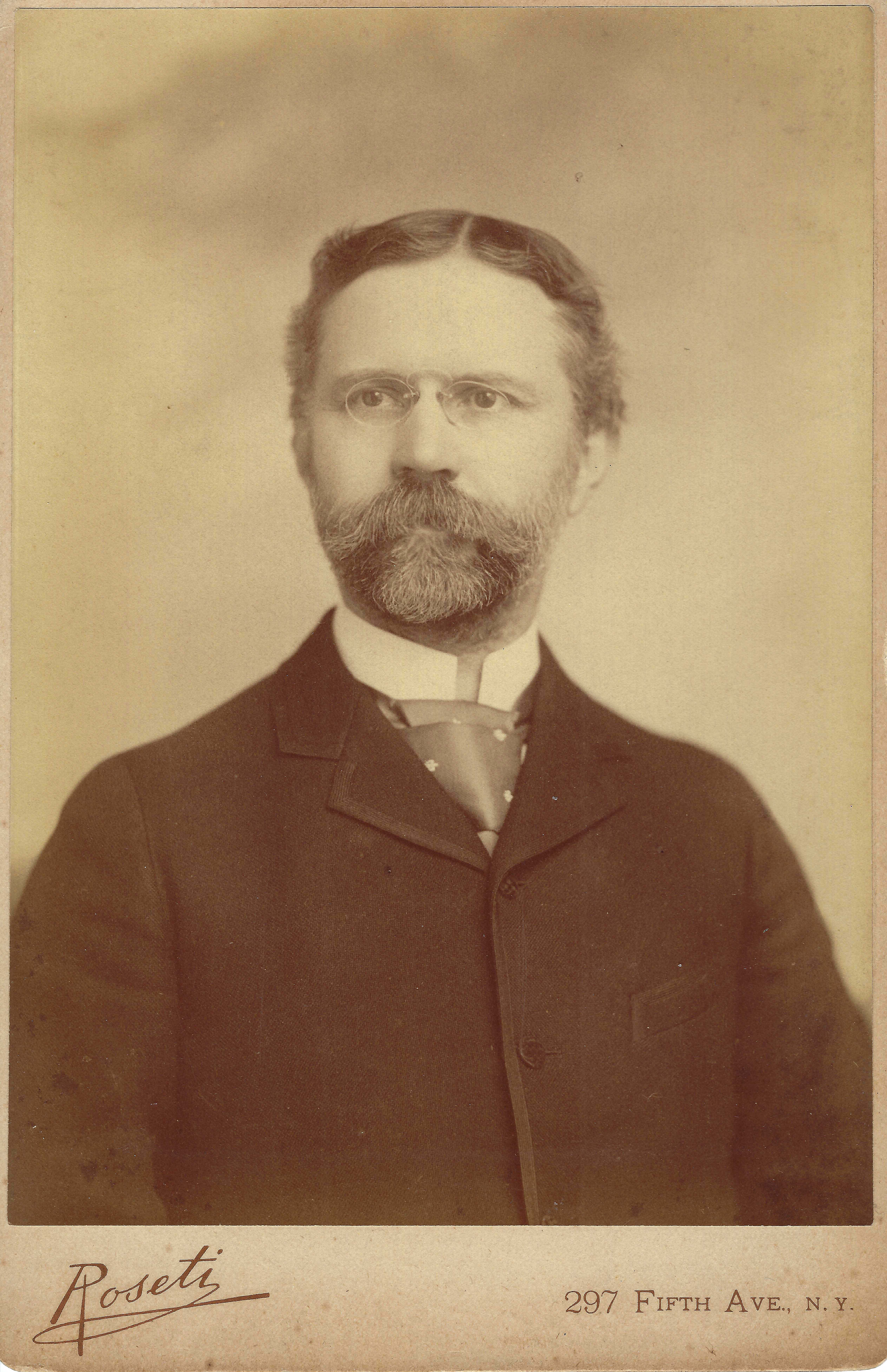
- Theodore Gilman in 1890
- Born: January 2, 1841; Alton, Illinois, United States
- Died: August 9, 1930 (aged 89); Yonkers, New York
- Occupations: Banker, progressive reformer
- Known for: Advocate for stabilizing the U.S. financial system with an idea that was a precursor to the Federal Reserve System
- Spouse: Elizabeth Drinker Paxson (m. 1863)
- Parent(s): Winthrop Sargent Gilman (father), Abia Swift Lippincott Gilman (mother)

Theodore Gilman (January 2, 1841 – August 9, 1930) was a New York banker, Progressive reformer, and early advocate for stabilizing the U.S. financial system with an idea that was a precursor to the Federal Reserve System. He spent most of his life in New York City as head of Gilman, Son and Company bank.

His campaign in the 1890s and early 1900s for a national network of bank clearing houses that could expand and contract the supply of money led to bills in Congress that the New York Times called "the first bill[s] ever introduced for the formation of a higher order of banks." In 1913, his plan was "embodied in the Federal Reserve Act."

== Early life ==
Theodore Gilman was born on January 2, 1841, in Alton, Illinois. His father, Winthrop Sargent Gilman, was a merchant and businessman. His mother, Abia Swift Lippincott Gilman, was the daughter of an abolitionist Presbyterian minister, Thomas Lippincott. When Theodore was five years old, Abia and the children moved to New York City, though Winthrop stayed in St. Louis for several years, running his business there. When Winthrop joined the family in New York, he founded the banking firm of Gilman, Son and Company, for many years located at 62 Cedar Street, two blocks from Wall Street. The bank mostly invested in Western businesses such as railroads, ranching, mining, and land-development schemes in states such as Iowa, Nebraska, Kansas, and Colorado. By 1901 The Bankers’ Magazine would write that "No banking house of the city is more highly regarded." Its clientele was "banks, bankers, merchants, corporations, and...individuals or estates. They also deal in first-class investment securities."

Theodore attended Williams College, where he earned a BA and MA. On graduating in 1862, Theodore joined the family bank, replacing his older brother Arthur as the "son" in Gilman, Son and Company. Arthur Gilman went on to found Radcliffe College; another brother, Benjamin Ives Gilman, became Secretary (i.e., director) of the Boston Museum of Fine Arts. Theodore would devote his life to solving the problems of the U.S. banking system.

The Gilman family had suffered periodic reverses in fortune all through the 19th century because of banking panics. Winthrop's business in Alton, IL, had been wiped out by the failure of the State Bank of Illinois in the Panic of 1837. In the Panic of 1873, Gilman, Son and Company suffered such losses that it was unable to pay its creditors. The bank survived, but the Gilmans had to sell the family home and retrench financially. By the Panic of 1893, Theodore was the president of the bank and saw the same scenario repeated. Soon after, he began advocating for a national remedy.

== Banking panics ==
The U.S. banking system in the 19th century has been described as "antiquated, disorganized, and deficient." Unlike Europe, where nationally chartered institutions like the Bank of England dominated, the United States had opted for a competitive, free-market model. Virtually anyone with capital could start a bank, and by the 1890s, there were thousands of private, local, and regional banks competing for business. Although the nation's economy was strong, there was no safeguard from bank runs, much less the national panics and subsequent recessions that occurred throughout the 19th century, with the worst taking place in 1837, 1873, and 1893.

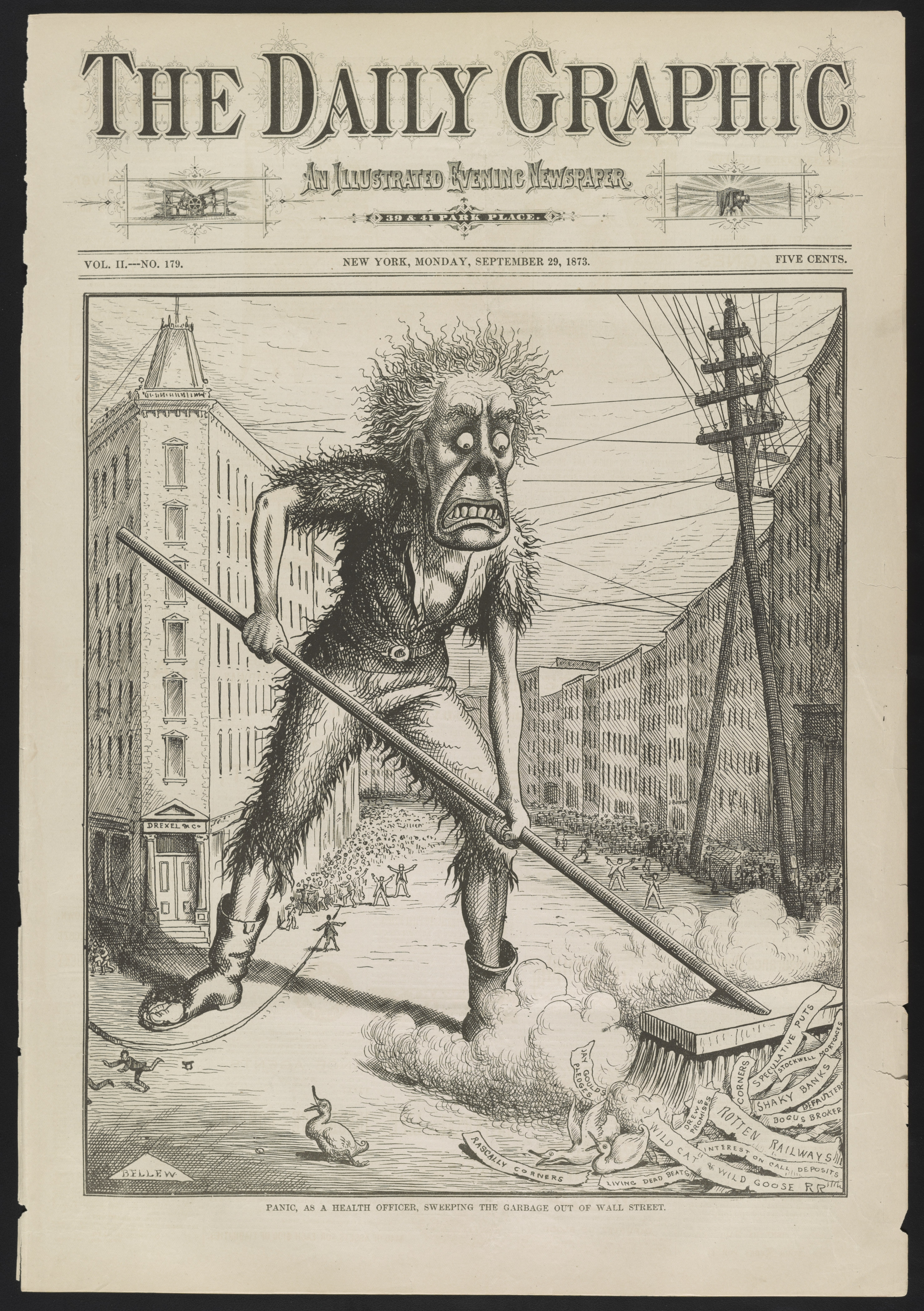
During the Panic of 1873, cartoonist Frank Bellew portrayed Panic sweeping the garbage out of Wall Street.

In self-preservation, some banks banded together to form regional "clearing houses" to handle transactions between themselves to meet fluctuating demands for cash. But as the country grew, the supply of money became unevenly distributed, with much of it concentrated in East Coast centers such as New York, so that banks in the Midwest and West often had too few resources to handle a sudden demand for money. Farmers and small businesses suffered from the instability and shortage of money for loans.

To remedy the situation, organizations and individuals such as the American Bankers Association, the Secretary of the Treasury, the Indiana Monetary Commission, and the New York Chamber of Commerce proposed loosening the restrictions on banks so that they could issue currency backed by a greater range of assets in their reserves. While popular with bankers, these proposals faced such public suspicion that they failed to gain traction in Congress.

== Proposals for banking reform ==
In the 1890s, Gilman began to advocate for the creation of a nationwide network of banking associations based on the existing system of bank clearing houses, which expanded into a national system. Banks would form regional clearing houses that would be incorporated under federal law and overseen by the U.S. Comptroller of Currency. The member banks would deposit some of their assets (such as loans, bonds, and stocks) in the clearing house, and when the need arose, they could borrow cash against the collateral they had deposited, eliminating the need to sell or liquidate the investments themselves. If the clearing house needed to issue more than 75% of the value of its assets, it could levy an assessment on all the banks in its membership, then on the clearing houses in the region, and finally on all clearing houses in the nation. The clearing houses would thus prevent member banks from failing by expanding the supply of money needed in a crisis, and the private wealth of the nation would back it. In fact, the New York Clearing House had already intervened in this way to stem panics, but without the national reach or authority Gilman suggested.

Gilman argued that his proposal was voluntary and cooperative, thus more in line with a free market and democracy than a central bank. "A banking system in a republic must partake of the same political character as the Government," he wrote. "Since the banks owe their lives, that is their charters, to the public will, it is their duty to reciprocate by doing whatever the welfare of the country demands of them." He portrayed banking as a public-spirited, even a patriotic, activity.

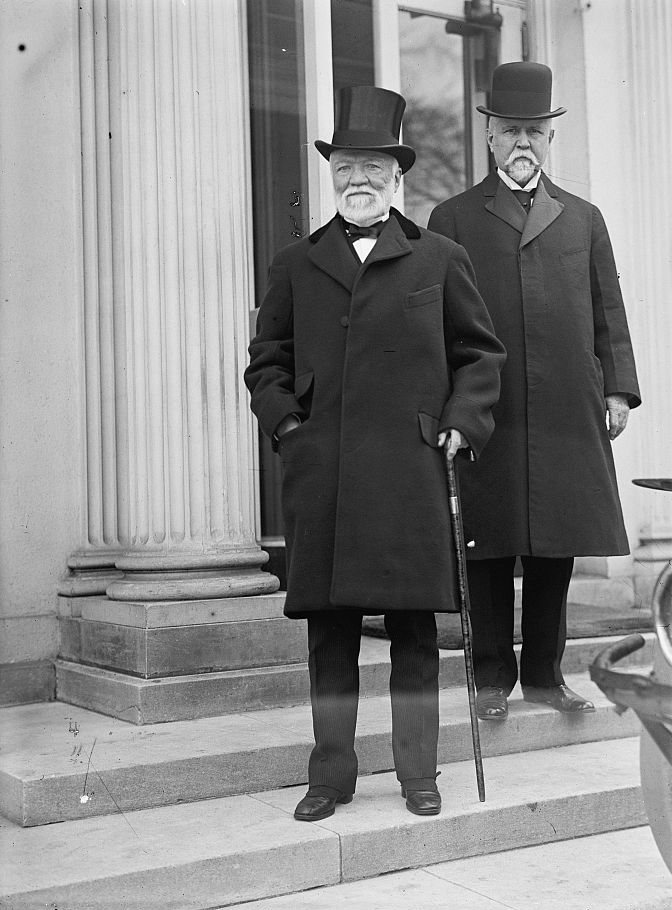
Theodore Gilman (right) with Andrew Carnegie (left) in Washington, D.C., 1914. They were involved together in western investments, notably the Keokuk and Hamilton Bridge Company.

In support of his approach, Gilman succeeded in getting bills he wrote introduced into Congress at least eight times between 1895 and 1906. He also set out to explain his ideas to the general public in two books: A Graded Banking System (1898) and Federal Clearing Houses (1899). He published articles in journals and letters to newspapers, and wrote members of Congress and two successive presidents, McKinley and Roosevelt, to familiarize them with his concepts.

Gilman's ideas gained support. In a review of Federal Clearing Houses, the Journal of Political Economy said, "Mr. Gilman's book is a strong presentation of the merits of his plan, and, in view of the great importance of an elastic currency in our monetary operations, it behooves those opposed to this, or who have rival methods to propose, to show the weakness of his cause."

But while he was engaged in reform, Gilman's own bank was struggling. In 1902, Gilman, Son and Company failed and had to be reorganized. Gilman retired to his home in Yonkers, leaving his sons in charge of the bank. He continued working for reform.

== Relation to the Federal Reserve ==
Despite Gilman's efforts, none of his bills passed, but the severity of the Panic of 1907 crystallized support for banking reform along the lines Gilman had been arguing. Congress responded by passing the Aldrich-Vreeland Act. In its initial form, the Senate bill followed the pattern of proposals by the banking industry. As rewritten by the House and signed into law by President Roosevelt, it established voluntary associations of banks that paralleled Gilman's proposals for clearing houses. It also established a National Monetary Commission to formulate a proposal for permanent reform.

Gilman praised the Aldrich-Vreeland Act as "wise, safe and efficient....Never before in the history of the financial world has there been an attempt to construct a banking system of, by and for the people." In 1914, it was put to the test when a bank panic began to spread at the onset of World War I. The clearing houses functioned as intended, and the panic was averted. Modern scholars have concluded that "The Aldrich-Vreeland Act was far more successful as a panic-preventive measure than anyone could have anticipated at the time of its passage."

After a secret, invitation-only meeting with powerful bankers at Jekyll Island, GA, the National Monetary Commission recommended replacing Aldrich-Vreeland with a central bank under the control of bankers. But once again, the House of Representatives rejected this solution in favor of one that resembled Gilman's proposal more closely: not a central bank, but a nationwide network of fifteen regional Reserve Banks where private banks could pool their resources. Together, the reserve banks formed a coordinated national system that could expand and equalize the money supply in times of crisis. It was not governed by the banks themselves, but by a board of governors who were answerable to the President and Congress. The Federal Reserve Act was passed by Congress in 1913, although it took several years to implement.

Both Senator Nelson Aldrich and Representative Carter Glass, founders of the Federal Reserve system, acknowledged its debt to the clearing house idea. "It is in effect an evolution of the clearing-house idea extended to include an effective central organization," Aldrich wrote. Modern scholars concur. "The Federal Reserve system, as originally conceived, was simply the nationalization of the private clearinghouse system," wrote Gary Gorton.

== Political activities ==
Gilman wrote about his experiences with Congress with deep disillusionment. He blamed their paralysis on "the political machine," in other words, party politics. He called it an "invisible government....They elude responsibility, for they have no corporate existence. They are open to corrupt deals, and in fact are a kind of clearing house for secret and underhanded arrangements between all parties." Gilman's disillusion drove him into the Progressive Party. He campaigned openly for Theodore Roosevelt's third-party presidential bid in 1912. He continued campaigning for his ideas, even extending the Federal Reserve concept to Europe (anticipating the European Central Bank), which he hoped would be "a perfect protection against war."

== Marriage and family ==
Theodore Gilman was married (in 1863) to Elizabeth Drinker Paxson, descendant of an old Philadelphia Quaker family. His oldest son, Theodore, Jr., continued working in banking; a younger son, Robbins, gave up banking to become a social worker in Minneapolis. Theodore lived in Yonkers until he died in 1930.

== Honors ==
Gilman City, Missouri, is named for Theodore Gilman.

== Published works ==
- A Graded Banking System. Houghton, Mifflin & Company. 1898.
- Federal Clearing Houses. Houghton, Mifflin & Company. 1899.
