= Theodore A. Switzler =

American military officer

Theodore A. Switzler (March 3, 1828 – January 21, 1879) was an American Union brevet brigadier general during the period of the American Civil War. He received his appointment as brevet brigadier general dated to March 13, 1865.

Switzler began his military career by organizing a company of the Dade County Home Guards and serving as their captain. He participated in the Battle of Wilson's Creek on August 10, 1861. After this battle, his company was combined with other units to form the 6th Missouri Volunteer Cavalry. On March 6, 1862, he was wounded in the neck by a small bullet at Sugar Creek, Arkansas, just before fighting in the Battle of Pea Ridge. Immediately afterward, on March 9, 1862, Switzler was promoted to the rank of major. On August 13, 1862, he was promoted to lieutenant colonel. Switzler also fought in the Battle of Prairie Grove, the Vicksburg campaign, and the Red River campaign. His profession was bookkeeper and merchant.
