= Theodore Brinckman =

Theodore Brinckman may refer to:

- Sir Theodore Brinckman, 1st Baronet (1798–1880), British MP for Yarmouth
- Sir Theodore Brinckman, 2nd Baronet (1830–1905), his son, British Liberal MP for Canterbury
- Sir Theodore Brinckman, 4th Baronet (1898–1954), British cricketer

== See also ==
- Brinckman (surname)
