= Teddy =

Teddy is an English language given name, usually a hypocorism of Edward or Theodore or Theodora. It may refer to:

== People ==
=== Nickname ===
- Teddy Atlas (born 1956), American boxing trainer and fight commentator
- Teddy Bourne (born 1948), British Olympic epee fencer
- Teddy Bridgewater (born 1992), American football quarterback
- Teddy Dunn (born 1981), American actor
- Teddy Edwards (1924–2003), American jazz saxophonist
- Tivadar Farkasházy (born 1945), Hungarian humorist, author, mathematician, economist and journalist
- Teddy Getty Gaston (1917–2013), American author and singer
- Teddy Gipson (born 1980), American basketball player
- Teddy Grace (1905–1992), American singer
- Teddy Higuera (born 1957), former Major League Baseball pitcher
- Teddy Hoad (1896–1986), West Indian cricketer
- Ted Kennedy (1932–2009), American senator from Massachusetts
- Teddy Kollek (1911–2007), six-time mayor of Jerusalem
- Theodore Long (born 1947), general manager for World Wrestling Entertainment
- Teddy Morgan (1880–1949), Welsh international rugby union player
- Teddy Park (born 1978), record producer for YG Entertainment
- Teddy Pendergrass (1950–2010), American singer and songwriter
- Teddy Petersen (1892–1991), Danish bandleader
- Teddy Pilley (1900–1982), linguist and conference interpreter
- Teddy Quinlivan (born 1994), American model
- Teddy Riley (born 1967), American singer, songwriter, musician and record producer
- Teddy Roe, African-American organized crime figure.
- Teddy Roosevelt (1858–1919), 26th president of the United States
- Teddy Sampson (1895–1970), American actress
- Teddy Scholten (1926–2010), Dutch singer
- Teddy or Teddi Schwartz (1914–2017), American Yiddish-language singer, writer and translator
- Teddy Sheean (1923–1942), Royal Australian Navy Second World War sailor awarded the Victoria Cross for Australia
- Teddy Sheringham (born 1966), English retired footballer
- Teddy Sinclair (born 1986), British singer and actress
- Teddy Taylor (1937–2017), British conservative politician
- Teddy Wilson (1912–1986), American jazz pianist
- Teddy Yarosz (1910–1974), world middleweight boxing champion (1934–1935)
- Teddy Yip (businessman) (1907–2003), Formula One racing team owner

=== Given name ===
- Teddy Apriyana Romadonsyah (born 1990), Indonesian basketball player
- Teddy Averlant (born 1999), Gabonese footballer
- Teddy Corpuz, Filipino singer, television presenter, actor and comedian
- Teddy Indra Wijaya (born 1989), Indonesian military officer and politician
- Teddy Louise Kasella-Bantu, Tanzanian politician
- Teddy Robin (born 1945), Hong Kong singer-songwriter, actor, and director and producer
- Teddy Lussi-Modeste (born 1978), French film director, screenwriter and literature teacher
- Teddy Nakimuli (born 2003), Ugandan boxer
- Teddy Nambooze, Ugandan accountant and legislator
- Teddy Reavis, American actress
- Teddy Riner (born 1989), French judoka
- Teddy Tahu Rhodes (born 1966), New Zealand operatic baritone
- Teddy Stiga (born 2006), American ice hockey player
- Teddy Tamgho (born 1989), French triple jumper
- Teddy Wang (1933–?), Chinese businessman kidnapped in 1990 and declared legally dead
- Teddy, Australian murder victim. He and his family were murdered by his son Sef Gonzalez

=== Stage name ===
- Teddy Geiger (born 1988), American singer and songwriter
- Teddy Hart (born 1980), ring name of Canadian professional wrestler Edward Annis
- Teddy Joyce (1904–1941), Canadian swing bandleader and actor
- Teddy Park (born 1978), South Korean rapper and record producer
- Teddy Swims (born 1992), American singer and songwriter
- Teddy Wang (1982–2026), Taiwanese actor

== Animals ==
- Teddy (horse), a racehorse and sire
- Teddy, Mack Sennett's dog in his silent movies

== Fictional characters ==
- Teddy Altman, a doctor on the TV series Grey's Anatomy
- Teddy Burns, from the TV series Man with a Plan
- Father Ted Crilly, from the TV series Father Ted
- Teddy Duncan, from the television series Good Luck Charlie
- Teddy Klaue, from the film Krampus
- Edward "Teddy" Lupin, from the Harry Potter series
- Teddy (Square root) Ortiz, a main character in the comic strip Big Nate
- Teddy Ruxpin, an animatronic talking bear
- Ted "Teddy" Talbot, Jr., in the TV series Rectify
- Teddy (Mr. Bean character), a bear character from the TV series Mr. Bean
- Teddy, in the TV series Bob's Burgers
- Teddy “KGB”, the main antagonist in the film Rounders
- Teddy, in the film Saraba Kamen Rider Den-O: Final Countdown
- Teddy, coroner's assistant in the film Halloween III: Season of the Witch
- Grizzly Teddy, in the film Demonic Toys
- Teddy, a playable character in the video game Mother

== See also ==
- Tedy Bruschi (born 1973), American football player
- Teodoro Locsin Sr. (1914–2000), Filipino journalist nicknamed "Teddy Boy"
- Teodoro Locsin Jr. (born 1948), Filipino politician, diplomat, lawyer and former journalist nicknamed "Teddy Boy", son of the above
- Ted (disambiguation)
- Tedi (disambiguation)
