= Théodore =

Théodore is the French version of the masculine given name Theodore.

== Given name ==
- Théodore Caruelle d'Aligny (1798–1871), French landscape painter and engraver
- Théodore Anne (1892–1917), French playwright, librettist, and novelist
- Théodore Année (1810 – after 1865), French horticulturist
- Théodore Aubanel (1829–1886), Provençal poet
- Théodore Aubert (1878–1963), Swiss lawyer and writer
- Théodore Bachelet (1820–1879), French historian and musicologist
- Théodore Bainconneau (fl. 1920), French wrestler
- Théodore Ballu (1817–1885), French architect
- Théodore de Banville (1823–1891), French poet and writer
- Théodore Baribeau (1870–1937), Quebec politician
- Théodore Baron (1840–1899), Belgian painter
- Théodore Barrière (1823–1877), French dramatist
- Théodore Baudouin d'Aubigny (1780–1866), French playwright
- Théodore de Bèze (1519–1605), French Protestant theologian
- Théodore Botrel (1868–1925), French singer-songwriter, poet and playwright
- Théodore Champion (1873–1954), Swiss cyclist, philatelist and stamp dealer
- Théodore Chassériau (1819–1856), French Romantic painter
- Théodore Cornut (fl. 1765), French mathematician and military architect
- Théodore Dabanga (born 1956), Central African banker and economist
- Théodore Deck (1823–1891), French potter
- Théodore Dézamy (1808–1850), French socialist
- Théodore Drouhet (1817–1904), Governor General of French India
- Théodore Dubois (1837–1924), French composer, organist and music teacher
- Théodore Ducos (1801–1855), French politician and shipowner
- Théodore Duret (1838–1927), French journalist, author and art critic
- Théodore Flournoy (1854–1920), Swiss psychologist
- Théodore Fourmois (1814–1871), Belgian landscape painter and printmaker
- Théodore Frère (1814–1888), French Orientalist painter
- Théodore Gardelle (1722–1761), Swiss painter and enameller
- Théodore Géricault (1791–1824), French painter and lithographer
- Théodore Gervais (1868–1940), Canadian doctor and politician
- Théodore Gosselin (1855–1935), French historian and playwright
- Théodore Guérin (1798–1856), French nun, founder of the Sisters of Providence of Saint Mary-of-the-Woods
- Théodore Herpin (1799–1865), French neurologist
- Théodore Holo (born 1948), Beninese politician, academic, and judge
- Théodore Basset de Jolimont (1787–1854), French artist, lithographer, painter and antiquary
- Théodore Simon Jouffroy (1796–1842), French philosopher
- Théodore Juste (1818–1888), Belgian historian and literary scholar
- Théodore Hersart de La Villemarqué (1815–1895), French philologist
- Théodore Labarre (1805–1870), French harpist and composer
- Théodore Lack (1846–1921), French pianist and composer
- Théodore Lajarte (1826–1890), French musicologist and librarian
- Théodore Legault (1886–1935), Ontario merchant and political figure
- Théodore Limperg (1879–1961), Dutch economist
- Théodore Maunoir (1806–1869), Swiss surgeon and co-founder of the International Committee of the Red Cross
- Théodore de Mayerne (1573–1654), Swiss-born physician to the kings of France and England
- Théodore Michel (fl. 1920), Luxembourgian swimmer
- Théodore Edme Mionnet (1770–1842), French numismatist
- Théodore Monbeig (1875–1914), French Catholic missionary and botanist
- Théodore Monod (1902–2000), French naturalist, explorer, and humanist scholar
- Théodore Muret (1808–1866), French playwright, poet, essayist and historian
- Théodore Nézel (1799–1854), French playwright and librettist
- Théodore Nouwens (1908–1974), Belgian footballer
- Théodore Nzue Nguema (born 1973), Gabonese footballer
- Théodore Olivier (1793–1853), French mathematician
- Théodore Pescatore (1802–1878), Luxembourgian politician
- Théodore Pilette (1883–1921), Belgian racecar driver
- Théodore Poussin, protagonist in the French comic book series of the same name
- Théodore Ralli (1852–1909), Greek painter, watercolourist and draughtsman in France
- Théodore Ravanat (1812–18833), French landscape painter
- Théodore Reinach (1860–1928), French archaeologist and scholar
- Théodore Richomme (1785–1849), French engraver
- Théodore Ritter (1840–1886), French composer and pianist
- Théodore Robitaille (1834–1897), Canadian physician and politician
- Théodore Rousseau (1812–1867), French painter
- Théodore Eugène César Ruyssen (1868–1967), French historian and pacifist
- Théodore Salomé (1834–1896), French organist and composer
- Théodore Sidot (fl. 1866), French chemist
- Théodore Simon (1872–1961), French psychologist
- Théodore Sindikubwabo (1928–1998), interim President of Rwanda during the Rwandan genocide
- Théodore Steeg (1868–1950), French philosopher and Premier of the French Third Republic
- Théodore Tronchin (theologian) (1582–1657), Swiss Calvinist theologian
- Théodore Tronchin (1709–1892), Swiss physician
- Théodore Turrettini (1845–1916), Swiss engineer and politician
- Théodore Varvier (1884–1913), French rugby player
- Théodore Vernier (1731–1818), French lawyer and politician during the revolution
- Théodore Vienne (1864–1921), French textile manufacturer and founder of the Paris–Roubaix cycle race
- Théodore Wichwael (died 1519), Auxiliary Bishop of Cologne

== Surname ==
- Gérard Théodore (1920–2012), French World War II soldier
- Jean-François Théodore (1946–2015), French businessman and CEO of Euronext
- José Théodore (born 1976), Canadian ice hockey goaltender

== Other ==
- Théodore, a tragedy by Pierre Corneille
