= Theodore Beauchaine =

American psychologist

- Education: Portland State University; Stony Brook University
- Awards: Distinguished Scientific Award for an Early Career Contribution to Psychology from the American Psychological Association (2006)
- Scientific career
- Fields: Psychology
- Thesis: Disinhibitory Psychopathology in Male Adolescents: Discriminating Conduct Disorder from ADHD through Concurrent Assessment of Multiple Autonomic States (2000)

Theodore P. Beauchaine is an American psychologist. His research focuses on neural bases of behavioral impulsivity, emotion dysregulation, and self-injurious behavior, and how these neural vulnerabilities interact with environmental risk factors (e.g., maltreatment, neighborhood violence and criminality, marginalization) across development for both boys and girls (as opposed to boys alone as in most previous research). He is among the first psychologists to specify how impulsivity, expressed early in life as ADHD, follows different developmental trajectories across the lifespan for boys vs. girls who are exposed to adversity. In contexts of maltreatment, deviant peer affiliations, and other environment risk factors, boys with ADHD are more likely to develop conduct problems, substance use disorders, and antisocial traits, whereas girls with ADHD are more likely to engage in self-injurious behavior (e.g., cutting) and develop borderline traits. In protective environments, these outcomes are far less likely. Beauchaine has received two awards from the American Psychological Association: the Distinguished Scientific Award for an Early Career Contribution to Psychology and the Mid-Career Award for Outstanding Contributions to Benefit Children, Youth, and Families.
