= Theodore Parker (disambiguation) =

Theodore Parker (1810–1860) was an American abolitionist.

Theodore Parker may also refer to:

- Theodore A. Parker III (1953–1993), American ornithologist
- Theodore W. Parker (1909–1994), United States Army general
