= Teodor Muzaka =

Teodor Muzaka or Theodore Musachi may refer to three despots of medieval Albania:

- Teodor I Muzaka (died 1389)
- Teodor II Muzaka (1389–1417)
- Teodor III Muzaka (1417–1444)
