= Theodore Weiss =

Theodore Weiss may refer to:

- Theodore Weiss (poet) (1916–2003), American poet
- Ted Weiss (Theodore S. Weiss, 1927–1992), U.S. congressman
- Theodore Hardeen (1876–1945), brother of Houdini, who went by the name of Theodore Weiss as a child
