= Bohdan (name) =

Bohdan is a Slavic masculine name that appears in the Czech, Polish, Slovak and Ukrainian languages. It is derived from the Slavic words Boh (Cyrillic: Бог), meaning 'god', and dan (Cyrillic: дан), meaning 'given'. The name appears to be an early calque from Greek Theódoros (Theodore, Theodosius).

The name also appears as a surname (Czech and Slovak feminine: Bohdanová). Bogdan is a counterpart of the name used in the South Slavic languages and in Polish and Romanian. Bohdana is the feminine version of the given name.

Notable people with the name include:

== Given name ==
- Bohdan Bułakowski (born 1950), Polish race walker
- Bohdan Khmelnytsky (c. 1595–1657), Ukrainian nobleman and military commander
- Bohdan Lepky (1872–1941), Ukrainian writer
- Bohdan Paczyński (1940–2007), Polish astronomer
- Bohdan Pomahač (born 1971), Czech plastic surgeon
- Bohdan Tůma (born 1967), Czech actor and voice actor
- Bohdan Sláma (born 1967), Czech film director
- Bohdan Stupka (1941–2012), Ukrainian actor
- Bohdan Ulihrach (born 1975), Czech tennis player
- Bohdan Warchal (1930–2000), Slovak violinist and dirigent

== Surname ==
- Andriy Bohdan (born 1976), Ukrainian politician
- Blanka Bohdanová (1930–2021), Czech actress
