= Theodore Sedgwick (disambiguation) =

Theodore Sedgwick (1746–1813) was an American attorney, Congressman, and jurist.

Theodore Sedgwick may also refer to:

- Theodore Sedgwick (lawyer) (1780–1839), American attorney and member of the Massachusetts House of Representatives
- Theodore Sedgwick (writer) (1811–1859), American attorney and legal author
- Theodore Sedgwick (diplomat), American businessman, former US Ambassador to the Slovak Republic
