= Theodorus of Byzantium =

Greek sophist of late 5th-century BC

Theodorus (Greek: Θεόδωρος) was a Greek sophist and orator of the late 5th century BCE, born in Byzantium.

Theodorus is noted by Plato in his ironic survey of oratory in the Phaedrus for mentioning "confirmation and further confirmation," and calls Theodorus "that most excellent artist in words." Phaedrus responds in turn by calling Theodorus "worthy." Quintillian references Plato's usage in his history of Oratory in the third book of the Instiutio Oratoria. The Loeb translation of the passage gives us the perhaps more appropriate reading of "word-artificer" for Plato's witticism. Diogenes Laërtius refers to him in a similarly cursorial manner.

Aristotle places him beside Tisias and Thrasymachus as the key movers in the history of rhetoric. Quoting the W. A. Pickard-Cambridge text: "For it may be that in everything, as the saying is 'the first start is the main part'... This is in fact what has happened in regard to rhetorical speeches and to practically all the other arts: for those who discovered the beginnings of them advanced them in all only a little way, whereas the celebrities of to-day are the heirs (so to speak) of a long succession of men who have advanced them bit by bit, and so have developed them to their present form, Tisias coming next after the first founders, then Thrasymachus after Tisias, and Theodorus next to him, while several people have made their several contributions to it: and therefore it is not to be wondered at that the art has attained considerable dimensions." The later Peripatetic school seems not to have been so kind. Dionysius of Halicarnassus, writing of the school in his era, 30 BCE, states that "It is important that they should not assume that all the principles of rhetoric are covered in Peripatetic philosophy, and that nothing significant has been discovered by Theodorus, Thrasymachus, Antiphon and their associates..." Some commentators conclude from the passage that Theodorus is linked significantly with Antiphon and Thrasymachus. Elsewhere, Dionysius speaks of him as antiquated, careless and superficial. Cicero describes him as excelling rather in the theory than the practice of his art.

The Byzantine Suda quotes the Phaedrus again in referencing Theodorus, with the translation giving the curious variation of "Daedalus of words." The Suda provides a brief listing of his works, declaring him the author of Against Thrasybulus, and Against Andocides, and other unspecified works.
