= Theodore Tracy Fairchild =

American politician

Theodore Tracy "TT" Fairchild (Born: June 22, 1865 Died: October 17, 1950) was a leader in the Republican Party in Elko County, Nevada. He served Nevada for 18 years as an Assemblyman from 1914 through 1918 and again from 1920 through 1922. In 1922, Fairchild was elected a Nevada State Senator and served through 1934. Fairchild was the President pro tempore of the Nevada Senate in 1929.

He was born June 22, 1865, the son of Oscar Llewellyn Crandall Fairchild and Winnifred Elizabeth Pitchford. He was the grandson of David Fairchild a California politician who came out during the California Gold Rush.

Tracy Fairchild's father was born in New York City, came out west in 1852 and got into the newspaper business in 1863 in Austin, Nevada. It was named the Reese River Reveille which is the oldest newspaper in the state. In 1871, he went to Oakland, California, and was part owner of the Oakland Daily News. In 1877, he returned and bought the Tuscarora Times which merged with the Tuscarora Mining-Review. The two newspapers merged in 1877 and was then called the Daily Times-Review.

Tracy was 31 years old when he took over the operations of the newspaper. When the mining had dwindled down by 1905; the paper was suspended, and Tracy expanded his ranching operation and then he entered politics.

He died on October 17, 1950. He was admitted to the Nevada Senate Hall of Fame by resolution on the Sixty-first day of the 70th session of the Nevada State Senate in Carson City, April 2, 1999.
