= Theodora (disambiguation) =

Theodora is a feminine given name. It may also refer to:

== Arts and entertainment ==
- Theodora (Handel), an oratorio by George Frideric Handel
- Theodora (1914 film), an Italian silent film
- Theodora (1921 film), an Italian silent film
- Theodora, an 1800 tragedy by Sophia Burrell

== Other uses ==
- Theodora Children's Charity, British charity
- Theodora, a synonym of the legume genus Schotia
