= Teodor Skuminowicz =

Lithuanian Roman Catholic prelate

Most Reverend Teodor Skuminowicz
- Auxiliary Bishop of Vilnius; Titular Bishop of Gratianopolis
- Church: Catholic Church
- Archdiocese: Diocese of Vilnius
- In office: 1652–1668

Orders
- Consecration: 29 September 1652 by Marcantonio Franciotti

Personal details
- Died: 24 September 1668 Vilnius, Lithuania

Teodor Skuminowicz or Theodorus Skumin (died on 24 September 1668) was a Roman Catholic prelate who served as Auxiliary Bishop of Vilnius (1652–1668) and Titular Bishop of Gratianopolis (1652–1668).

== Biography ==
On 12 August 1652, Teodor Skuminowicz was appointed during the papacy of Pope Innocent X as Auxiliary Bishop of Vilnius and Titular Bishop of Gratianopolis. On 29 September 1652, he was consecrated bishop by Marcantonio Franciotti, Cardinal-Priest of Santa Maria della Pace, with Giovan Battista Foppa, Archbishop of Benevento, and Ranuccio Scotti Douglas, Bishop Emeritus of Borgo San Donnino, serving as co-consecrators. He served as Auxiliary Bishop of Vilnius until his death on 24 September 1668.

== External links and additional sources ==
- Cheney, David M. "Archdiocese of Vilnius". Catholic-Hierarchy.org. (for Chronology of Bishops) ^{[self-published]}
- Chow, Gabriel. "Metropolitan Archdiocese of Vilnius (Lithuania)". GCatholic.org. (for Chronology of Bishops) ^{[self-published]}
- Cheney, David M. "Gratianopolis (Titular See)". Catholic-Hierarchy.org. (for Chronology of Bishops) ^{[self-published]}
- Chow, Gabriel. "Titular Episcopal See of Gratianopolis (Algeria)". GCatholic.org. (for Chronology of Bishops) ^{[self-published]}

Catholic Church titles
Preceded by	Titular Bishop of Gratianopolis; 1652–1668	Succeeded by Mikolaj Słupski
Preceded by	Auxiliary Bishop of Vilnius; 1652–1668	Succeeded by
