= Tewodros =

- Pronunciation: Amharic: [te'wodros]
- Gender: Male

Origin
- Origin: Greek
- Meaning: Theodore

Other names
- Related names: Tawadros, Theodore

Tewodros may refer to:

- Tewodros I, Emperor of Ethiopia (1413–1414)
- Tewodros II, Emperor of Ethiopia (1818–1868)
- Tewodros Ashenafi, Ethiopian entrepreneur
- Tewodros Assefa, Ethiopian rapper known by the stage name Teddy Yo
- Tewodros Bekele, Ethiopian trade unionist
- Tewodros Kassahun, Ethiopian singer known by the stage name Teddy Afro
- Tewodros Mihret, Ethiopian lawyer
- Tewodros Shiferaw, Ethiopian runner

== See also ==
- Tawadros (disambiguation)
- Tadros, Christian Arab given name and surname
- Tedros, Ethiopian and Eritrean name; list of people
- Theodore (disambiguation)
- Theodore (name)
- Theodore (surname)
