= Tawadros =

- Pronunciation: [tɑˈwɑdros]
- Gender: Male

Origin
- Origin: Greek
- Meaning: Theodore

Other names
- Related names: Tadros, Tewodros, Theodore

Tawadros is an Arabic variant (تواضروس) of the name Theodore, both originating from the Greek Θεόδωρος Theōdoros.

It may refer to:

- Pope Tawadros II of Alexandria (born 1952), leader of the Coptic Orthodox Church of Alexandria, Egypt
- Joseph Tawadros (born 1983), Egyptian-Australian oud virtuoso
- Theodore Abu Qurrah, 9th-century Middle Eastern theologian
- 23922 Tawadros, main belt asteroid

== See also ==
- Tewodros (disambiguation)
- Theodore
- Theodore (name)
- Theodore (disambiguation)
