= Sack of Euchaita =

811 Sack by the Abbasids

Sack of Euchaita (811)
- Part of the Arab–Byzantine wars
- Map of Byzantine Asia Minor and the Byzantine-Arab frontier region c. 780
Date	22 February 811
Location	Euchaita, Asia Minor
Result	Abbasid victory

Belligerents
Byzantine Empire	Abbasid Caliphate

Commanders and leaders
Leo the Armenian	Unknown

Casualties and losses
Majority killed	Unknown

The Sack of Euchaita was a minor military engagement between the Abbasids and the Byzantines in Euchaita. An Arab raiding force captured and sacked Euchaita, gaining a large amount of gold.

== Background ==
After the death of the Abbasid Caliph Harun al-Rashid in 809, his sons Al-Amin and al-Ma'mun fought a civil war between them for four years, which was ended by the siege of Baghdad and the execution of Al-Amin. During the civil war, Byzantium could not take advantage of the situation as they were also preoccupied with another threat, which was the Bulgarians. The Byzantine emperor Nikephoros I was preparing to launch a campaign against the Bulgarians. By 811, Nikephoros has collected the necessary money for the campaign. The Byzantines during that time were not expecting any attack from the Abbasid frontier raiding parties since major hostilities died down after the death of Harun al-Rashid. However, this was not the case. The Caliph Al-Amin has shown some interest in the frontier region. He had ordered the refortifications of Adana, which would become a major Arab base for raiding. By October 810, the Arabs were in a strong position to launch a raid.

== Capture ==
In early 811, the Arabs launched a raid against the Armeniac theme. Although they were hesitant to raid in winter, this was an unexpected maneuver. The Arabs set their eyes on the headquarters of the Armeniac theme, which was Euchaita. The strategos of the theme, Leo the Armenian, was preparing to send out the annual payroll to his soldiers. The theme was free from Arab raiders for years, and was not expecting any attack. On February 22, the Arabs arrived at the town and took it without any resistance; the Byzantine garrison was caught by surprise, and the majority were slaughtered. Leo managed to escape. Euchaita was sacked, and the Arabs captured 1,300 pounds of gold, or 93,600 nomismata.

== Aftermath ==
The sack of Euchaita was devastating to the emperor. He had Leo punished by flogging him and exiled for his negligence. The sack also resulted in transferring the headquarters to Amasya.

== Sources ==
- Warren Treadgold (1988), The Byzantine revival, 780-842.
- T. Venning (2006), A Chronology of the Byzantine Empire.
- Pavlos E. Niavis (1984), The Reign of the Byzantine Emperor Nicephorus I (AD 802-811).
