= Toros =

Toros may refer to:

== Sports ==
- Toros de Tijuana, a Mexican baseball team
- Toros F.C., a Salvadoran football club in Usulután
- Austin Toros (2005–2014), now Austin Spurs, a minor league basketball team from Austin, Texas
- Rio Grande Valley FC Toros, an American soccer team in Edinburg, Texas
- Western District Toros, now Adelaide Atletico VSC, a soccer club from Adelaide, South Australia

== Geography ==
- Taurus Mountains (Toros Dağları or Toroslar), a mountain range in southern Turkey
- Toros (village), a village in Lukovit Municipality, Bulgaria

== Other uses ==
- TOROS artillery rocket system (Turkish: Topçu Roket Sistemi), a short range missile
- Toros Bravo, a Spanish fighting bull
- Toros Roslin (c.1210–1270), Armenian illustrator of manuscripts
- Anta Toros (1948–2025), Turkish-Armenian actress
- Toros University, Mersin, Turkey
- St. Toros Church, Jerusalem

== See also ==
- Thoros (disambiguation)
- Taroç family
