= Theodore Stratelates =

Christian martyr and saint (281–319)

Saint Theodore Stratelates
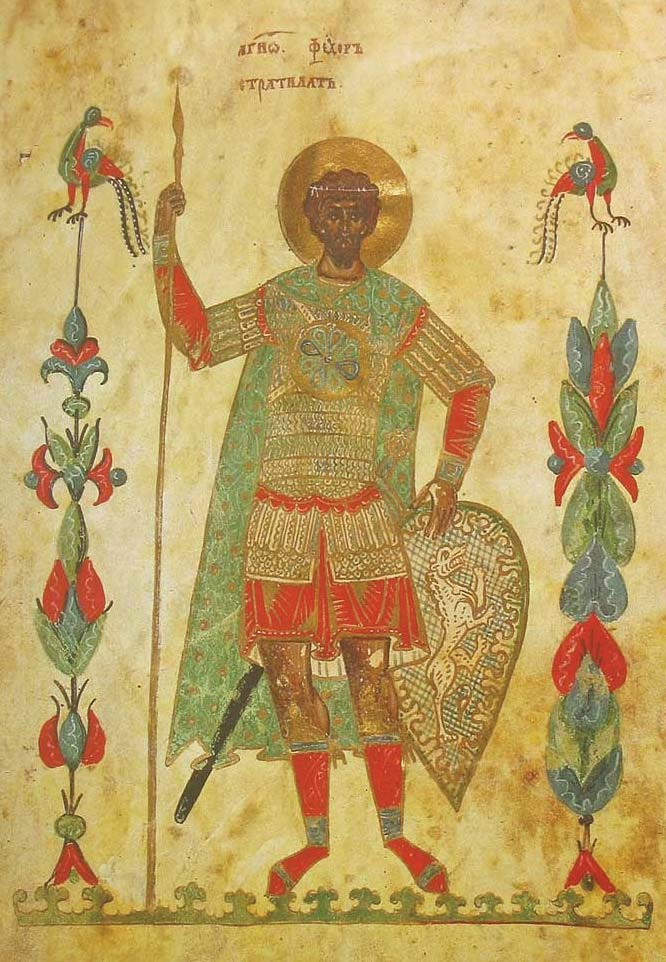
- St. Theodore Stratelates; from the personal Gospel Book of St. Theodore the Black.

Great Martyr
- Born: 281; Achaea, Roman Empire
- Died: 8 February 319 (aged 37–38); Heraclea Pontica, Roman Empire
- Venerated in: Eastern Orthodox Church; Eastern Catholic Church; Oriental Orthodox Churches; Roman Catholic Church
- Feast: 8 February, formerly 7 February in the Latin Rite but not now liturgically celebrated in the western church; 20 Epip, 15 and 20 Hathor (Coptic Church)
- Attributes: Dressed as a warrior, with spear and shield, or as a civilian
- Patronage: soldiers, Federal Bailiffs Service (Russia)

Theodore Stratelates (Ancient Greek: Ἅγιος Θεόδωρος ὁ Στρατηλάτης, transl. 'the General' or 'Military Commander'; Coptic: ⲡⲓⲁⲅⲓⲟⲥ Ⲑⲉⲟⲇⲱⲣⲟⲥ), also known as Theodore of Heraclea (Ancient Greek: Θεόδωρος Ἡρακλείας; AD 281–319) or Theodore of Arabia, was a martyr and warrior saint in the Eastern Orthodox, Catholic and Oriental Orthodox Churches.

There is much confusion as to whether he and St. Theodore of Amasea were the same person, as the stories about their lives later diverged into two separate traditions.

== Life ==
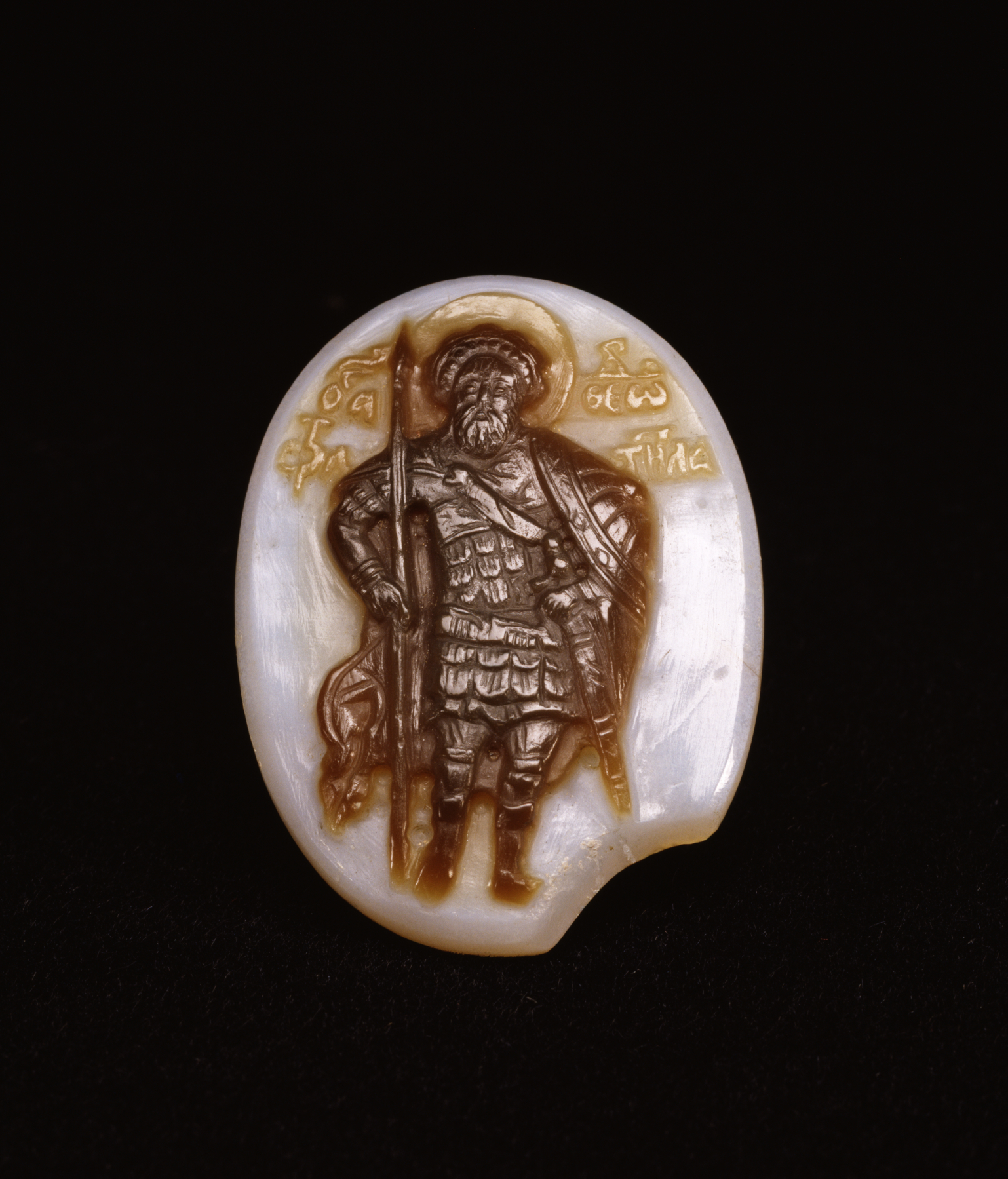
Small cut-stone depicting images of Saint Theodore were encased in precious metal frames and worn around the neck by both clerics and laymen The Walters Art Museum.

Of Greek origin, Theodore was born in the city of Euchaita in Asia Minor. He killed a giant serpent living on a precipice in the outskirts of Euchaita. The serpent had terrorised the countryside. Theodore armed himself with a sword and vanquished it. According to some of the legends, because of his bravery, Theodore was appointed military-commander (stratelates) in the city of Heraclea Pontica, during the time the emperor Licinius (307–324) began a fierce persecution of Christians. Theodore invited Licinius to Heraclea, having promised to offer a sacrifice to the pagan gods. He requested that all the gold and silver statues of the gods which they had in Heraclea be gathered up at his house. Theodore then smashed them into pieces which he then distributed to the poor.

Theodore was arrested and subjected to torture and crucified. His servant Varos (also venerated as a saint), witnessed this and recorded it. In the morning the imperial soldiers found him alive and unharmed. Not wanting to flee a martyr's death, Theodore voluntarily surrendered to Licinius, and was beheaded by the sword. This occurred on 8 February 319, on a Saturday, at the third hour of the day. His "life" is listed in Bibliotecha Hagiographica Graeca 1750-1754.

== The two Theodores ==
Numerous conflicting legends grew up about the life and martyrdom of Theodore of Amasea so that, in order to bring some consistency into the stories, it seems to have been assumed that there were two different venerated individuals, St Theodore Tiron of Amasea and Theodore Stratelates of Heraclea. The earliest text referring to the two saints is the Laudatio of Niketas David of Paphlagonia in the 9th century. It was said that his Christianity led to many conversions in the Roman army, which was the reason that Licinius was so concerned. Christopher Walter treats at length of the relationship between these saints.

It is suggested that Theodore Tiron as a recruit and ordinary foot soldier was viewed by the people of Byzantium as a patron of common soldiers and that the military aristocracy sought a patron of their own rank.

Another possibility is that he was in fact originally derived from a third Theodore called Theodore Orientalis from Anatolia.

In art both Theodore of Amasea and Theodore Stratelates are shown with thick black hair and pointed beards. In older works they were often distinguished by the beard having one point for Theodore Tiron of Amasea and two points for Stratelates as in the fresco from the Zemen Monastery below.

There is much confusion between them and each of them is sometimes said to have had a shrine at Euchaita in Pontus. In fact the shrine existed before any distinction was made between the saints. The separate shrine of Stratelates was at Euchaneia (the modern Çorum in Turkey), a different place 26 km west of Euchaita (the modern village of Beyözü).

It is a predominant view among the western scholars that there was only one Theodore. Delehaye wrote in 1909 that the existence of the second Theodore had not been historically established, while Walter in 2003 wrote that "the Stratelates is surely a fiction".

Before Saint Mark's relics were (according to tradition) brought to Venice in 828, Theodore was the patron saint of the city. The Doge of Venice's original chapel was dedicated to that saint, though, after the translation of Saint Mark's relics, it was superseded as his chapel by St Mark's Basilica. This may be either Theodore of Amasea or Theodore Stratelates, but the Venetians do not seem to have distinguished between them.

=== Eastern Orthodox perspective ===
Gregory of Nyssa preached a panegyric of St. Theodore of Amasea, in which he vividly described the decoration of the sanctuary at Euchaita in 381. The data he gives about the martyr's life and passion differ significantly from the vita of St Theodore Stratelates, composed by his servant Avgaros or Uaros/Varus (Ancient Greek: Αὔγαρος or Οὔαρος). Although the two Theodores were both martyred under the emperor Licinius in northern Anatolia, the actual places of martyrdoms (Heraclea Pontica in the province of Bythinia and Amasea in the province of Pontus) are quite far apart (380 km as the crow flies, 480 km on foot). The confusion arose because their main sanctuaries were close to each other: Theodore Stratelates was connected with Euchaneia (Çorum) while Theodore Tiron was from Euchaita (Beyözü), 26 km apart). Small Euchaita was proclaimed an episcopal city by Emperor Anastasius (491-518), who declared that he was acting under the inspiration of the holy martyr Theodore. Usually the western researchers interpret the lack of references to two Theodores in the valley of Iris (up to the 9th century) as proof that they were one and the same person. However, this may be explained by the fact that, in the 9th century, the pilgrimage site of Euchaneia started to flourish, while Euchaita had already diminished in importance, although it was the capital of Armeniac Theme.

=== Coptic perspective ===
Theodore is known in Egypt as "Saint Theodore of Shotep", "Saint Tadros of Shotep" or "Prince Theodore" (Coptic: ⲡⲓⲁⲅⲓⲟⲥ Ⲑⲉⲟⲇⲱⲣⲟⲥ; Arabic: الأمير الشهيد تادرس الشطبي, lit. ''Martyr Prince Tadros El Shatby''). He was born to a soldier in the Roman army named John, an Egyptian from the town of Shateb (Shoteb, Shutb, Shotep), near Asyut in Upper Egypt. His mother Oussawaia was the daughter of a prince. John married her when he went to Antioch to fight against the Persians. When his wife learned that he was a Christian, she attempted to make him deny his faith and become a pagan. When John refused, she drove him out of the house. Later, an angel appeared to John and assured him in regards to Theodore, saying that he would be the reason for the faith of many people in Christ. John rejoiced at what he heard and decided to return to his home in Upper Egypt.

The days passed and Theodore grew. He was awarded the title of prince, because his grandfather was a prince and his mother as well, and because of his father's high position in the army. Theodore's mother sent him to the army to become a soldier, and over the years he became famous for his courage and skill. Through his friends he learnt that his father was a Christian, and so he returned to his mother and told her what he had heard, and was angry because she had lied to him and said that his father had died in the war.

At this point, Theodore decided to become a Christian. He went to the priest called Olgianus and asked to rely on the name of Christ. A priest taught him the foundations of Christian faith. Over time he became a brilliant military commander and when Diocletian heard about him, he appointed him a commander over five hundred knights, and called him Prince Theodore the Esphehlar (i.e. brave commander).

Life continued and one day, the saint wanted to meet his father. He took a search to know his father's home and decided to go and met him. He travelled to Alexandria and from there to Shotep. He went to the church of the city and prayed, and then asked for a person named John, and the people told him where he was and that he was suffering from a severe illness. Theodore went to John's house and met him. His father was very glad to meet him and thanked God for achieving his request, and they talked together. Five days later, John died. Theodore and the people buried him, and the people offered consolation to Theodore. He told them that when he died, they must bury him next to his father John. A war was raging between the Persians and the Romans, and the emperor called Theodore to go to Antioch for war. The prince left the village, travelled to Antioch and met Theodore of Amasea. Here the story is similar to the above-mentioned. Many churches have been built in his name since the time of Emperor Constantine, and he currently has many churches named after him throughout Egypt, and for the great fame of the saint in Egypt, including an archaeological monastery in his name in Madinet Al Hawamdeyah, Giza. It is said that the body of the saint rests there. After he was attended by his mother when he became a Christian in the reign of Emperor Constantine, an area in Alexandria was named by that name the region became known as Alexandria "Shatby" attributed to him.

== Commemoration ==
His annual feast day is commemorated on 8 February or 7 February in the Latin Rite, though this is no longer liturgically celebrated in the Roman Catholic church.

One of the few ceramic icons in existence, dated to c. 900, shows Saint Theodore. It was made by the Preslav Literary School and was found 1909 near Preslav, Bulgaria (now National Archaeological Museum, Sofia).

== Gallery ==
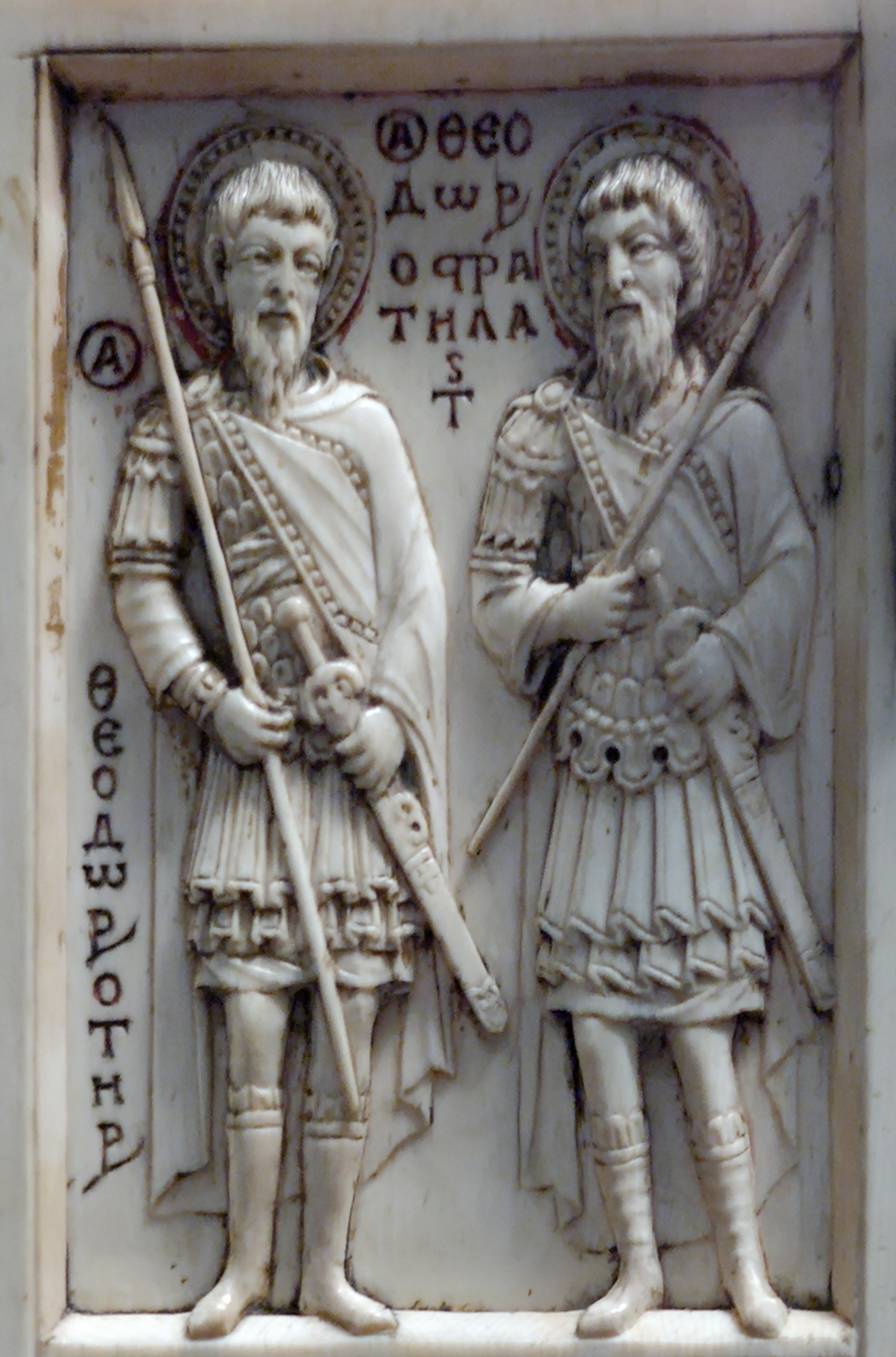
Theodore Tiron & Theodore Stratelates (right) from the Harbaville Triptych (Ivory; in the Louvre) from a workshop in Constantinople - mid-10th century

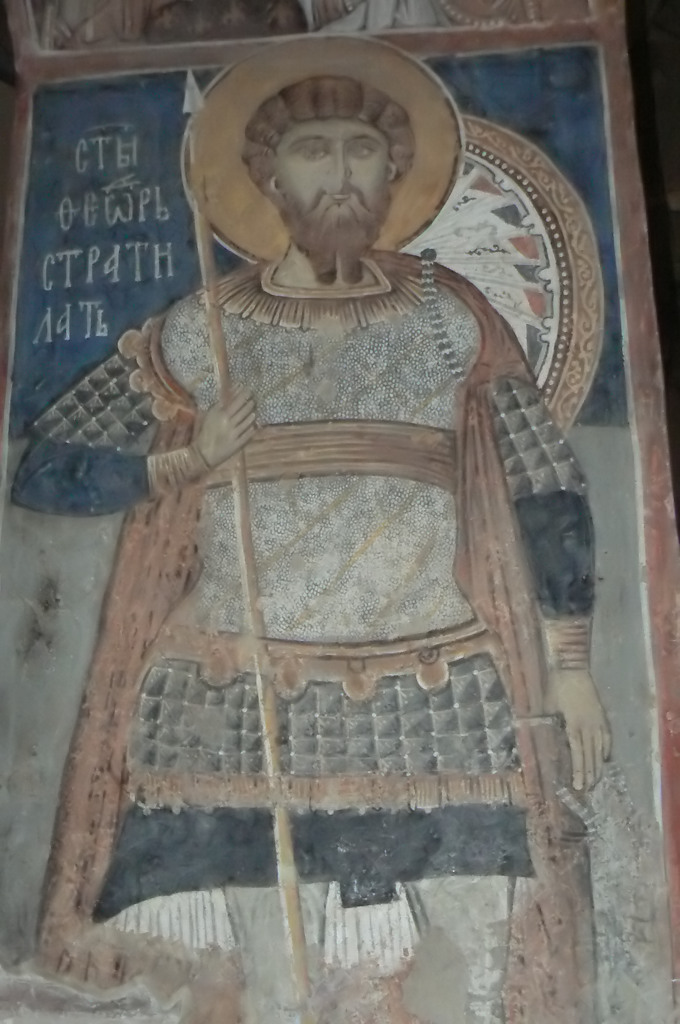
Fresco icon of Saint Theodore Stratelates, Zemen Monastery, Bulgaria 11th century?

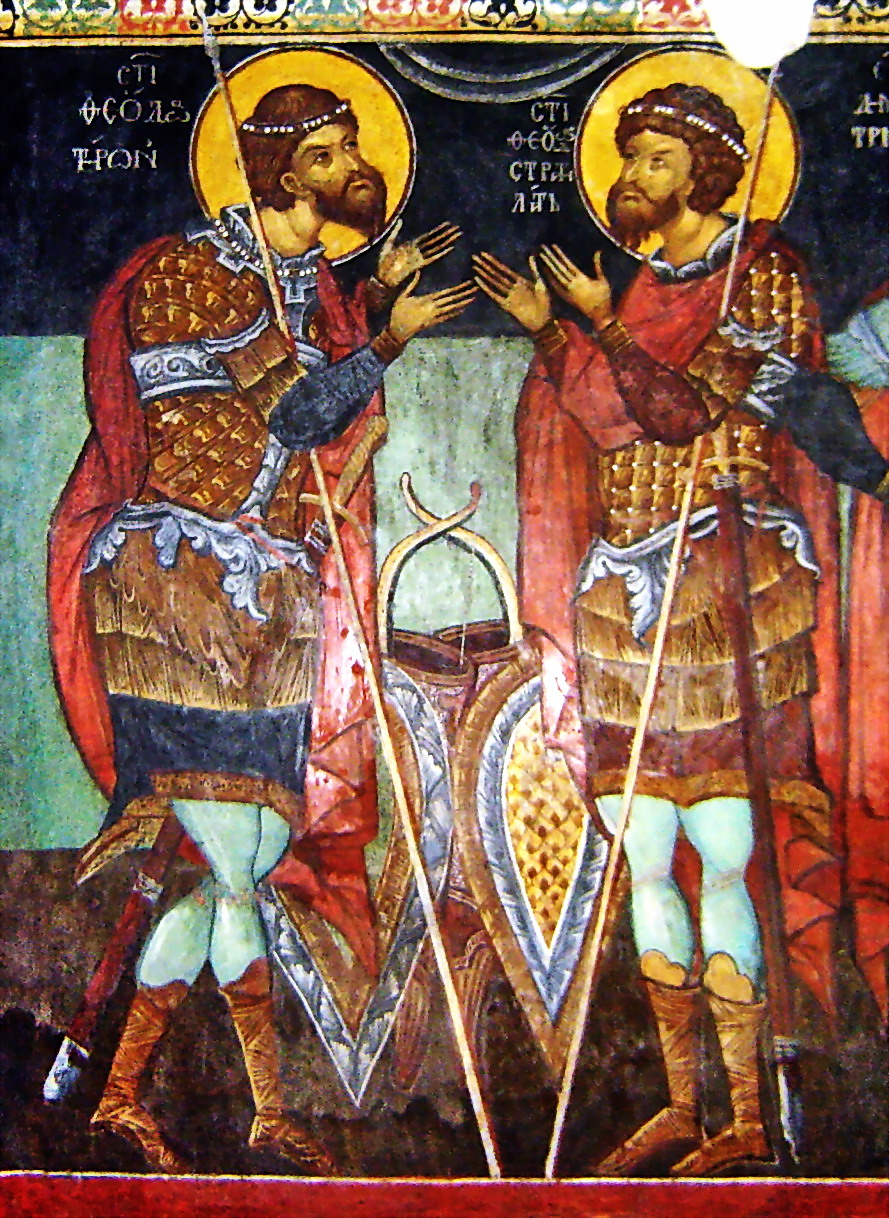
Theodore of Amasea (on the left) and Theodore Stratelates (on the right) - a fresco from Kremikovtsi Monastery, Bulgaria (16th century?)

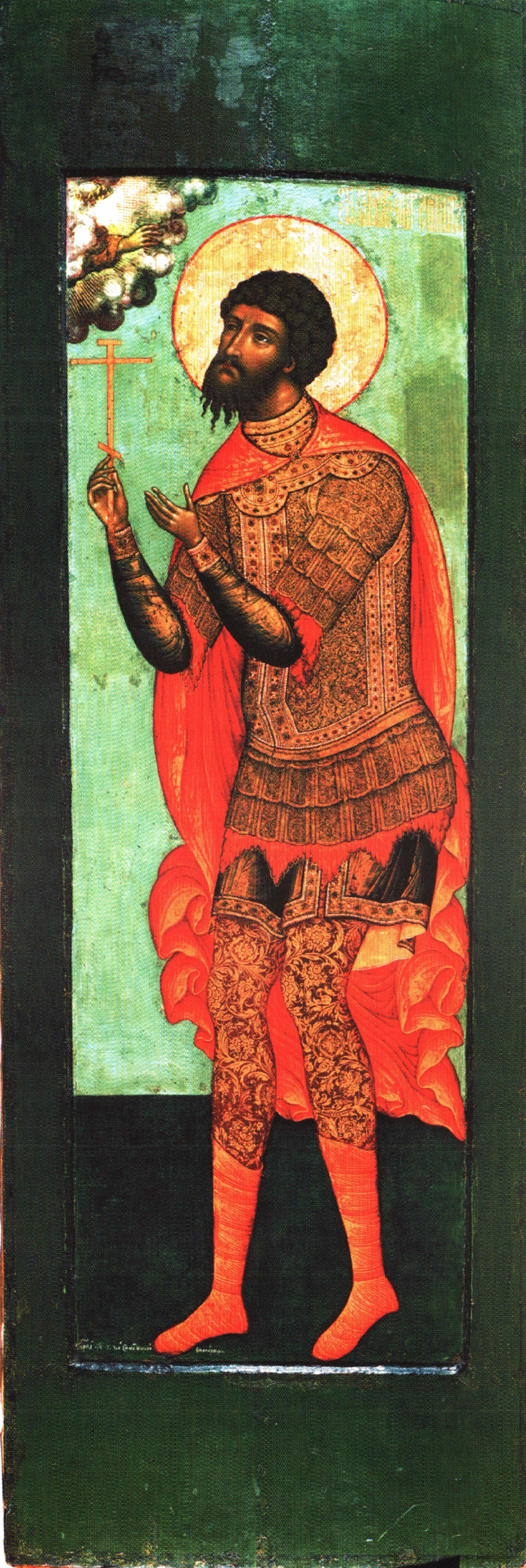
Icon of Saint Theodore by Simon Ushakov, 1676

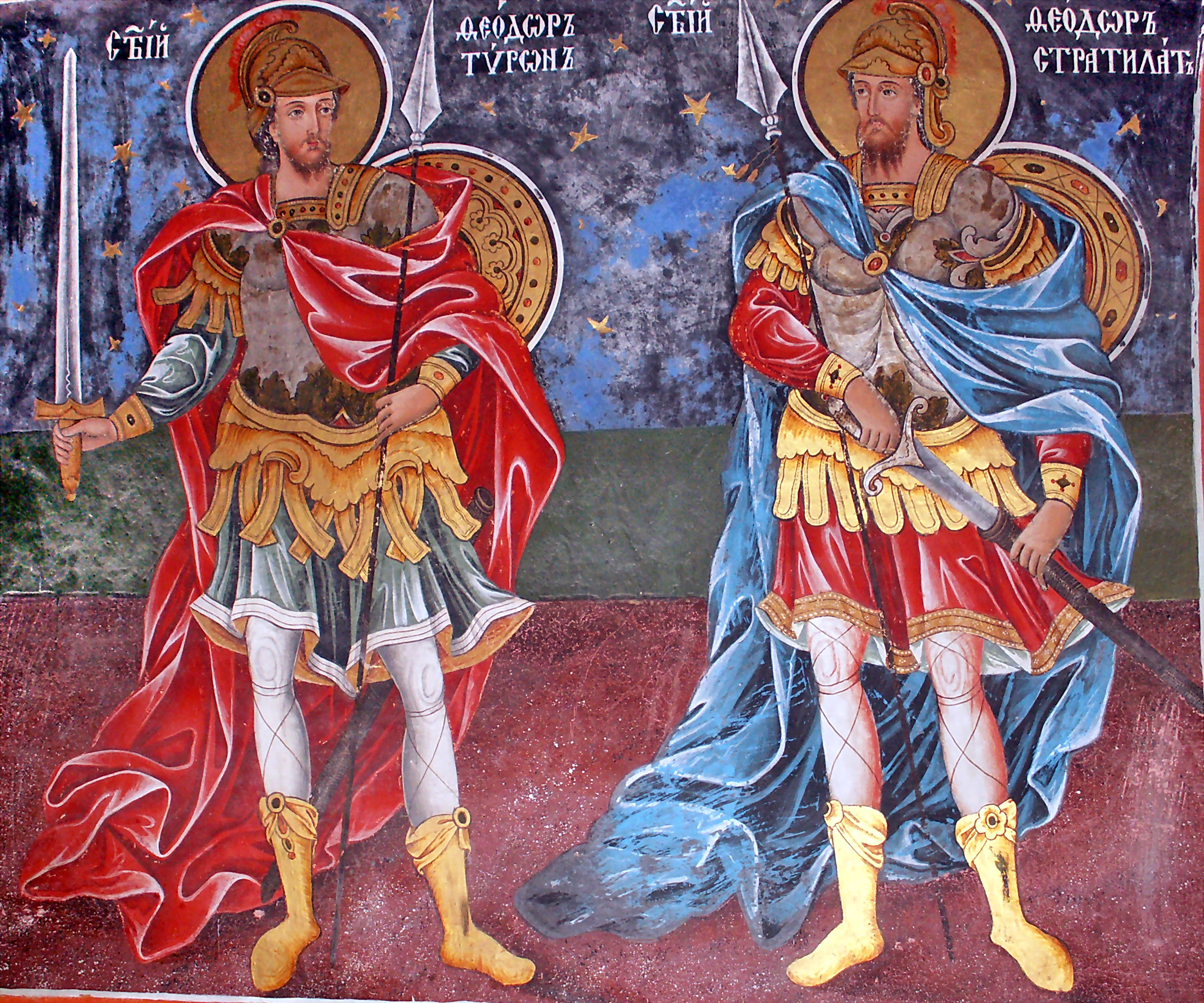
Theodore of Amasea (on the left) and Theodore Stratelates (on the right) - a fresco from Rila Monastery, Bulgaria (19th century?)

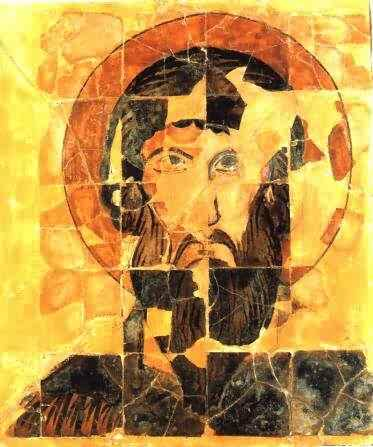
Ceramic icon of Saint Theodore, Preslav, circa 900 AD, National Archaeological Museum, Sofia

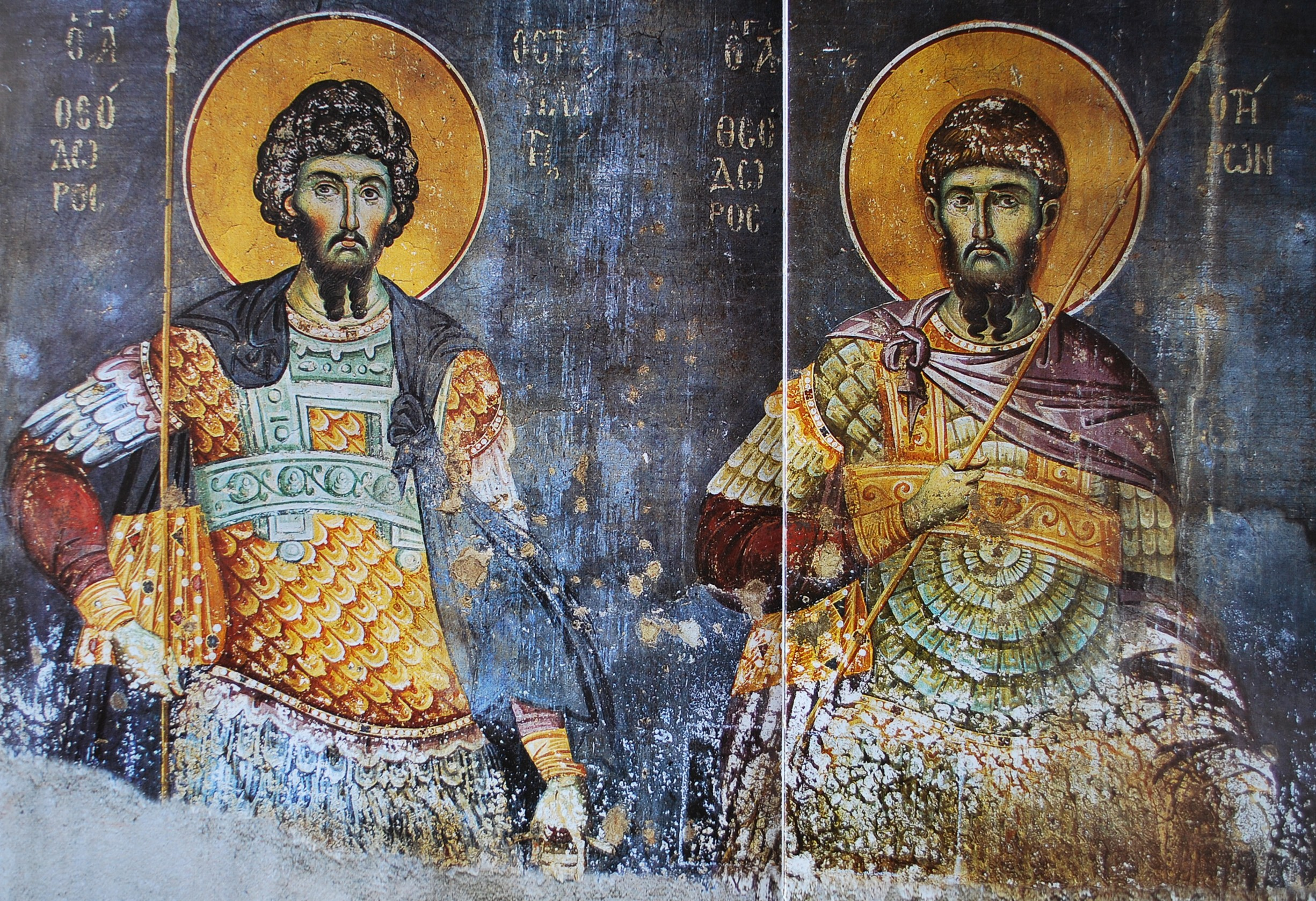
Fresco of the Saint Theodores from Protaton, Mount Athos

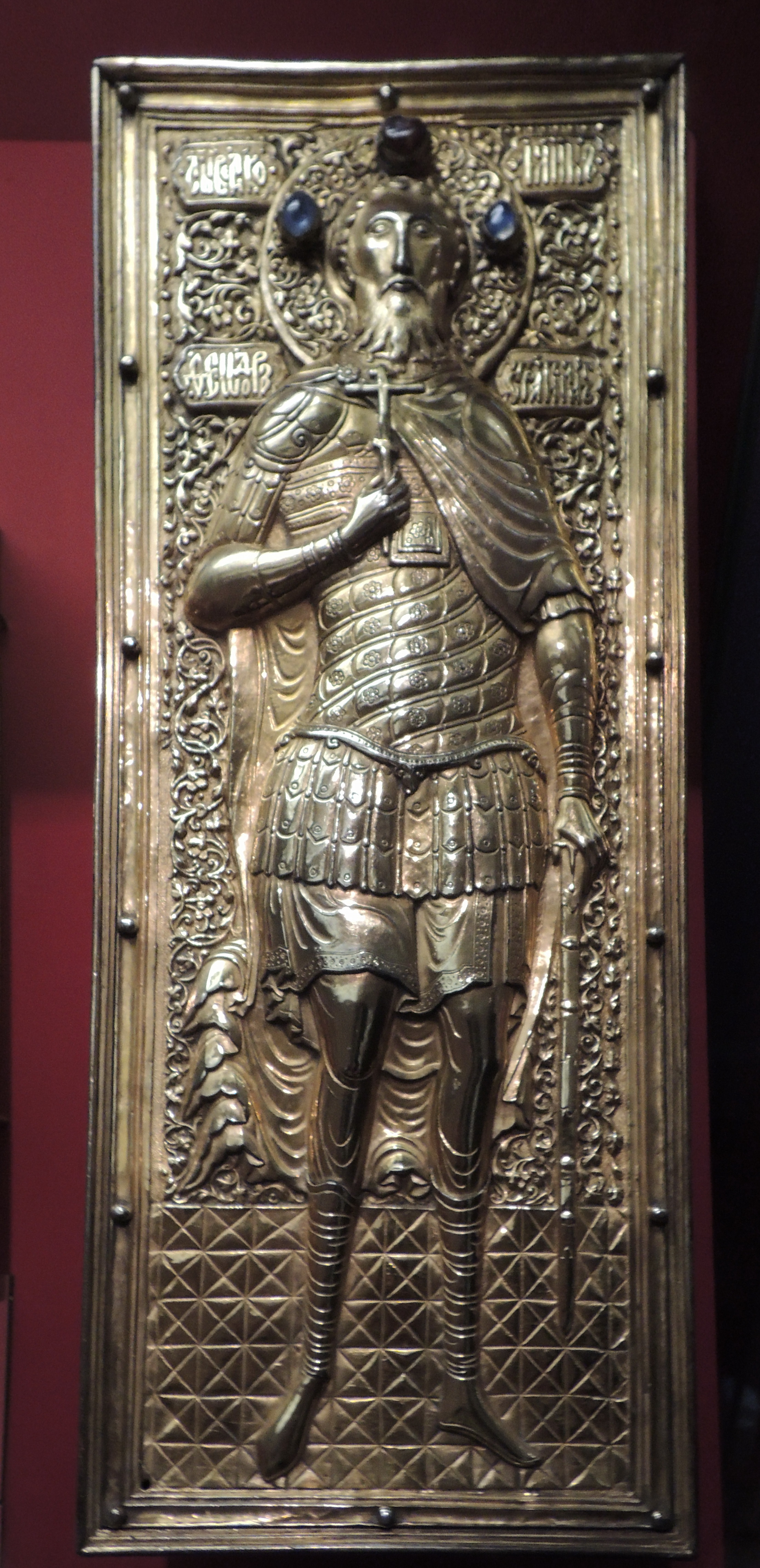
Reliquary from the Cathedral of the Annunciation, Moscow, 1598

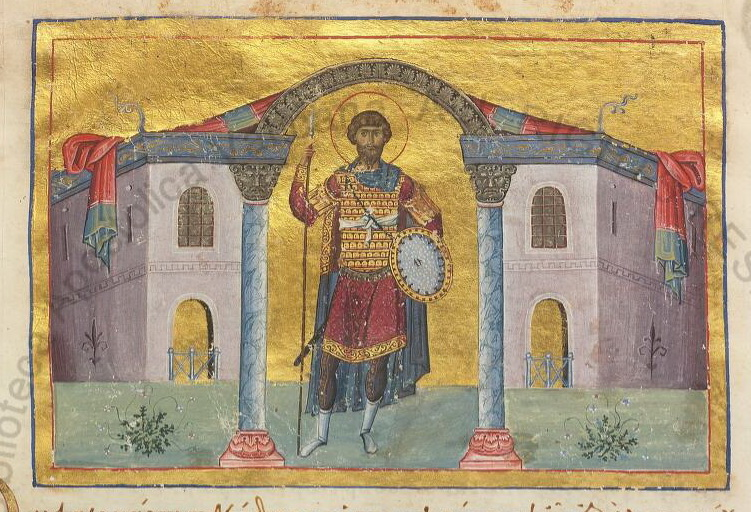
Miniature from the Menologion of Basil II

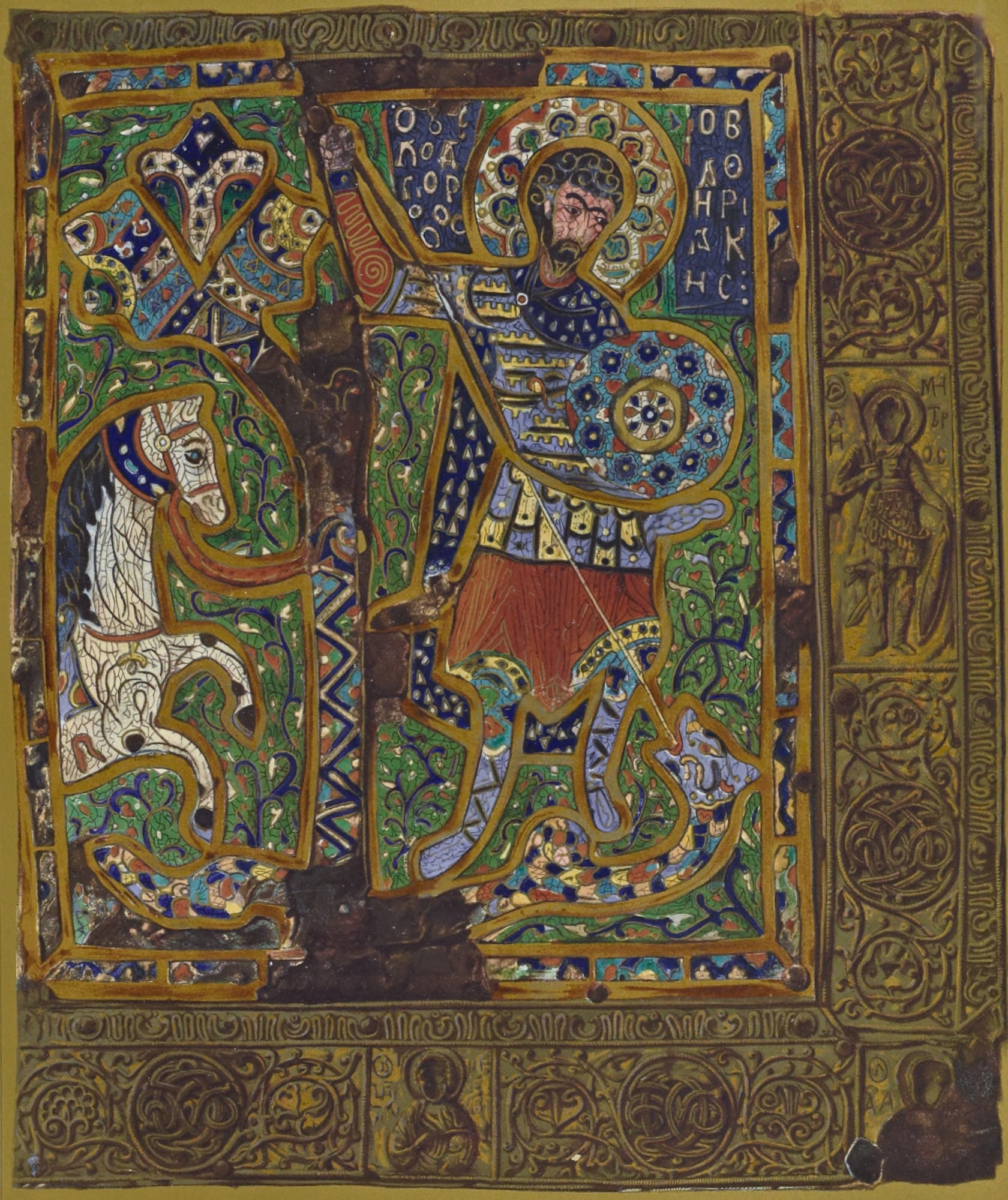
Enamel icon, Hermitage Museum

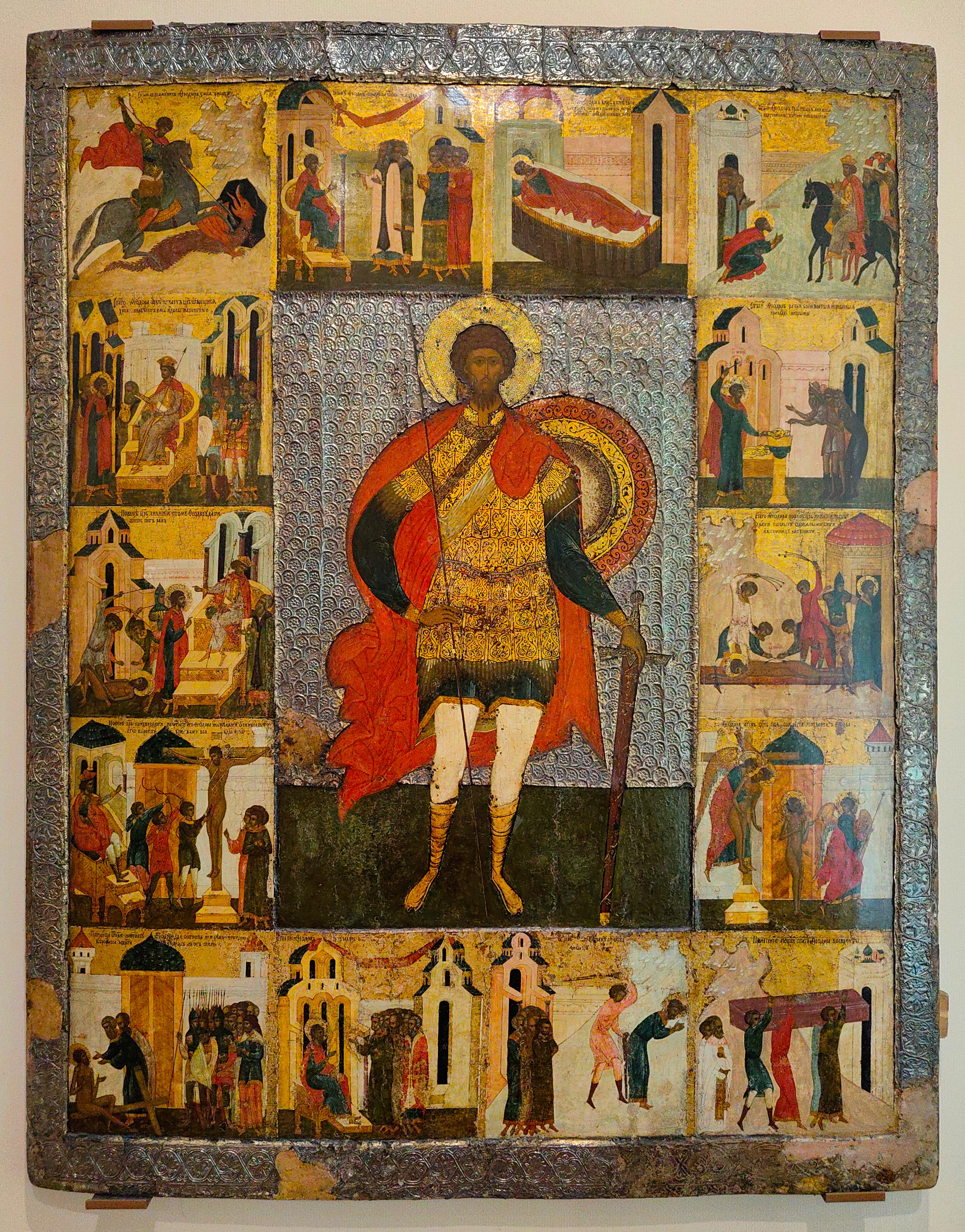
Icon with scenes from the Novgorod Art and History Museum

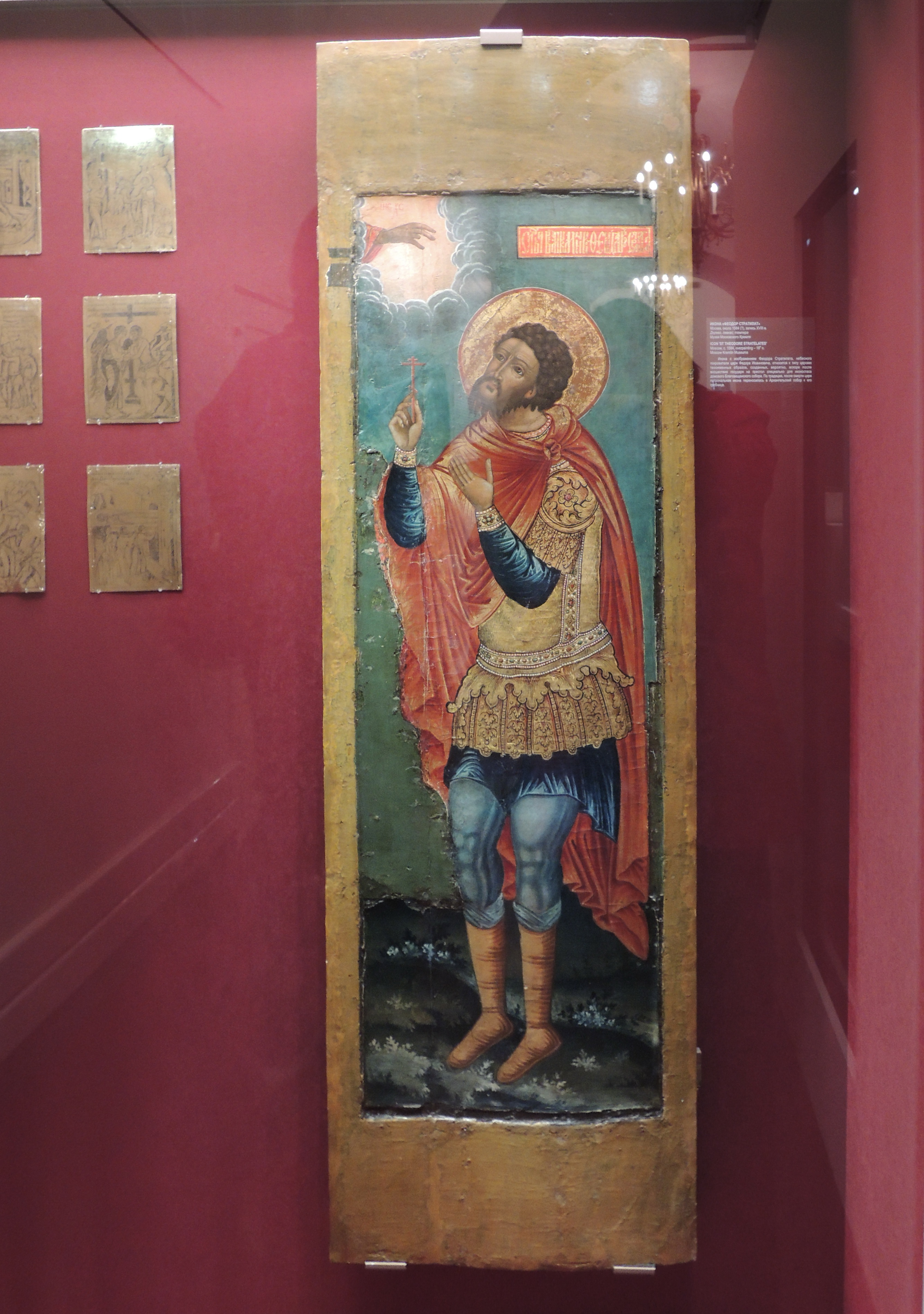
Icon from Moscow, 1584

== See also ==
- Simeon I of Bulgaria
- Theodore the Martyr

== Sources ==
- Book of Saints, The "A dictionary of servants of God canonised by the Catholic church" compiled by the Benedictine monks of St Augustine's Abbey, Ramsgate (6th edition, revised & rest, 1989)
- Butler's Lives of the Saints (originally compiled by the Revd Alban Butler 1756-1759)
- Delaney, John J: Dictionary of Saints (1982)
- Delehaye, Hippolyte: Les Legendes Grecques des Saints Militaires (Paris.1909)
- Demus, Otto: The Church of San Marco in Venice (Washington 1960)
- Demus, Otto: The Mosaics of San Marco in Venice (4 volumes) 1 The Eleventh & Twelfth Centuries - Text (1984)
- Farmer, David: The Oxford Dictionary of Saints (4th edition, 1997)
- Destephen, S. "Martyrs locaux et cultes civiques en asie Mineure". in: J.-P. Caillet, S. Destephen, B. Dumézil et H. Inglebert (ed.), Des dieux civiques aux saints patrons (IVe-VIIe siècle), Paris, Picard, 2015.
- Grotowski, Piotr: Arms and Armour of the Warrior Saints: Tradition and Innovation in Byzantine Iconography (843–1261) (Leiden 2010)
- Mango C. and Ševčenko I., “Three Inscriptions of the Reigns of Anastasius I and Constantine V”, Byzantinische Zeitschrift , 65, 1972, p. 379-393.
- Nicol, Donald MacGillivray (1988). Byzantium and Venice: A study in diplomatic and cultural relations. Cambridge: Cambridge University Press. ISBN 9780521341578. OCLC 17546371.
- The Oxford Companion to the Year (by Bonnie Blackburn & Leofranc Holford-Stevens) (Oxford 1999)
- Oikonomidès, N. Le dédoublement de saint Théodore et les villes d΄ `Euhaïta et d΄ `Euchaneia, Analecta Bollandiana 104 (1986) p. 327–335.
- Walter, Christopher: The Warrior Saints in Byzantine Art and Tradition (2003)
- Συναξάριον, Σάββατον Α' Εβδομάδος, ΤΡΙΩΔΙΟΝ ΚΑΤΑΝΥΚΤΙΚΟΝ της Αγίας και Μεγάλης ΤΕΣΣΑΡΑΚΟΣΤΗΣ, εκδόσεις ΦΩΣ, ΑΘΗΝΑ
