= Euchaneia =

Byzantine city in the Armeniac Theme

Euchaneia (ἡ Εὐχάνεια, also τὰ Εὐχάϊνα) was a Byzantine city in the Armeniac Theme, in what is now the West Black Sea Region of Turkey. It was the site of the shrine of Saint Theodore Stratelates.

Its precise location is unknown. It was either identical with, or nearby Euchaita, the site of the veneration of Theodore Tiro. It is also possible that it was identical with Euchaita before the 10th century, and became established as a separate site in or after the 10th century. The "duplication" of Euchaita into Euchaita and Euchaneia is closely related to the "doubling" of Saint Theodore Tiron into the two Theodores (Άγιοι Θεόδωροι), Theodore Tiron and Theodore Stratelates, at about this time.

With the ascent of the veneration of Theodore Stratelates, Euchaneia increased in importance, and emperor John I Tzimiskes in 972 renamed it to Theodoropolis (Greek: Θεοδωρόπολις). Scholarly opinion remains divided. Delehaye (1909) argued that the two cities were identical, while Oikonomides (1986) argued that Euchaneia was at the site of modern Çorum, about one day's march (35 km) from Euchaita,
