= Church of Saint Toros =

Armenian Orthodox church in Jerusalem

Coordinates: 31°46′28.51″N 35°13′42.23″E

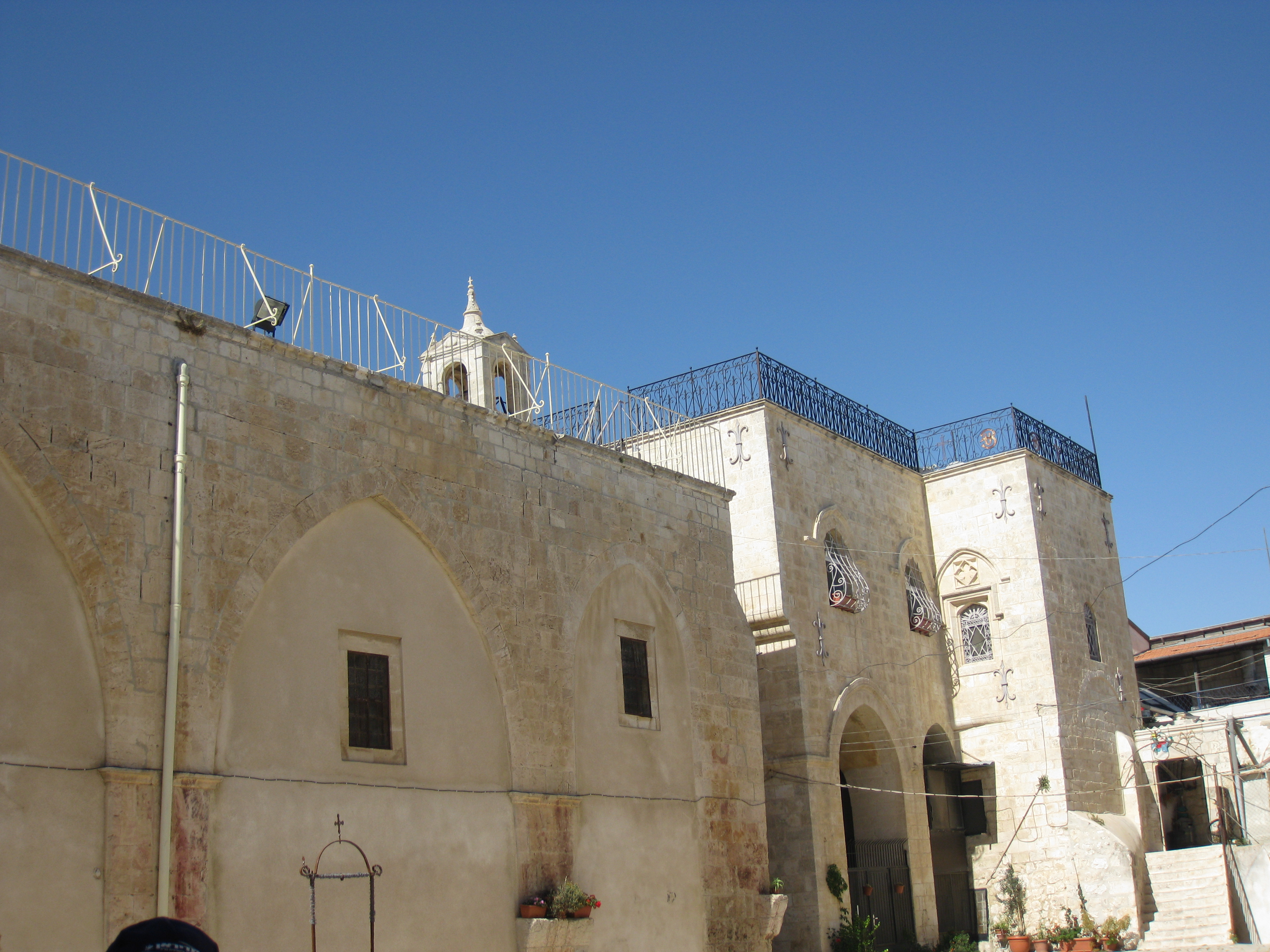
Church of St. Toros, Jerusalem

Church of Saint Toros (Armenian: Սուրբ Աստվածածին եկեղեցի) is an Armenian Orthodox church in the Armenian Quarter of Jerusalem.

== History ==
The Church of St. Toros is located next to St. James' Cathedral. Some 4,000 ancient manuscripts are kept at the church (cf. St. Toros Manuscript Library). This collection of Armenian illustrated manuscripts is the second largest in the world, after one in Armenia. When former Armenian President Levon Ter-Petrosyan visited Israel, Palestine and occupied East Jerusalem, the Church of Saint Toros was an important stop on his itinerary.

Thoros, also transliterated as T'oros, is the Armenian equivalent of the name Theodore (Theodoros in Greek).

== See also ==
- Armenians in Israel and Palestine
- Christianity in Israel
- Armenian church architecture
