= Theodore Tiron =

Anatolian saint

Saint Theodore
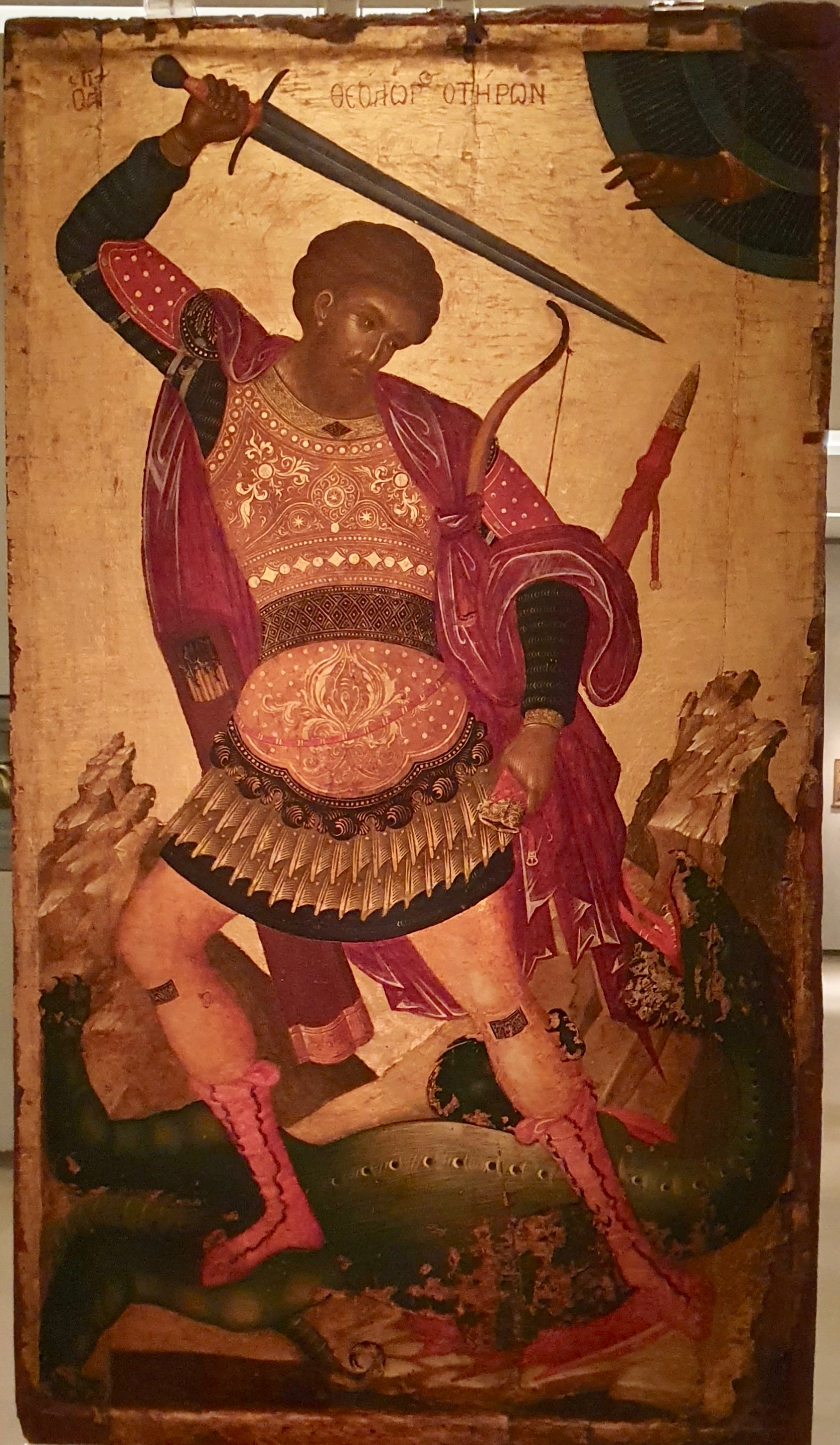
- Icon by Angelos Akotantos

Martyr
- Born: unknown Euchaita, Roman Empire (modern-day Beyözü,Çorum , Turkey)
- Died: 17 February 306; Amasea, Roman Empire (modern-day Amasya, Turkey)
- Feast: Catholic Church: 9 November; Eastern Orthodox Church: 17 February and the first Saturday in Great Lent; Korčula: 27 July
- Attributes: Dressed as a soldier sometimes in court dress, with emblems such as a spear, temple, torch, crocodile or dragon, pyre, crown of thorns
- Patronage: soldiers, Venice, Brindisi, against storms, recovery of lost articles

For another Saint Theodore, see: Theodore Stratelates or Saint Theodore (disambiguation).

Saint Theodore (Άγιος Θεοδώρος), distinguished as Theodore of Amasea, Theodore the Recruit (Θεοδώρος ό Τήρων), and by other names, is a Christian saint and Great Martyr, particularly revered in the Eastern Orthodox Churches but also honored in Roman Catholicism and Oriental Orthodoxy. According to legend, he was a legionary in the Roman army who suffered martyrdom by immolation at Amasea in Galatian Pontus (modern Amasya, Turkey) during the Great Persecution under Diocletian in the early 4th century. Venerated by the late 4th century, he became a prominent warrior saint during the Middle Ages, attracted a great deal of additional legends including accounts of battle against dragons, and was often confused with (or was the original source of) the similar Theodore Stratelates of Heraclea.

== Names ==
Theodore is the English form of the Latin masculine given name Theodorus from Ancient Greek Theódōros (Θεόδωρος) from Theós (Θεός, "God") + dō̂ron (δῶρον, "gift"). In Rome, he was also known to locals as St Toto. He was eventually distinguished from other saints named Theodore as Theodore the Recruit, Theodore the Tyro, or Theodore the Soldier (Latin: Theodorus Tyro or Tiro; Ancient Greek: Θεόδωρος Τήρων or ὁ Τήρων, Theódōros Tḗrōn or ho Tḗrōn). (Note: The Latin epithet tyro ("recruit") preceded the Greek and was also variously hellenized as Týrōn (Τύρων), Tírōn (Τίρων), Tḕrōn (Τήρων), and Teírōn (Τείρων).) The same name is variously anglicized as Theodore Tiron, Tiro, Tyron, Tyro, and Teron. (Nilles argued that this epithet was a later mistake and that, rather than being a recruit, Theodore's name had originally referenced his service in the Cohors Tyronum.) The saint is also distinguished as Theodore of Amasea, Theodore of Euchaita, and Theodore Martyr. The epithets are not generally needed, as Theodore Tiron is generally the intended saint when the name "St Theodore" is used without other clarification.

== Legend ==
=== Martyrdom ===
Theodore was a Greek, born in Amasea. The basic legend recounts that Theodore's cohort was sent to Pontus for winter quarters. Christianity was still illegal and Galerius, prior to his 311 Edict of Toleration at Serdica, enforced his co-emperor Diocletian's Great Persecution. When the soldiers of Theodore's cohort were obliged to perform pagan sacrifice at Amasea in Galatian Pontus (modern Amasya, Turkey, about 30 miles or 48 kilometres south of the Black Coast at Sinop), he refused and recounted a confession of faith in the divinity of Jesus Christ. Rather than immediately execute him, the judges—taking pity on his youth—delayed their sentence to allow him to change his mind. Theodore then burned the city's temple of Magna Mater (Cybele), whereupon he was again arrested, tortured, and martyred by immolation. The year of his martyrdom is cited as 287 in the legenda aurea, but later tradition including Butler has the year 306. His relics were later carried to Euchaita, possibly his birthplace, by the Christian empress Eusebia sometime before her death in 360.

=== Dragon slaying ===
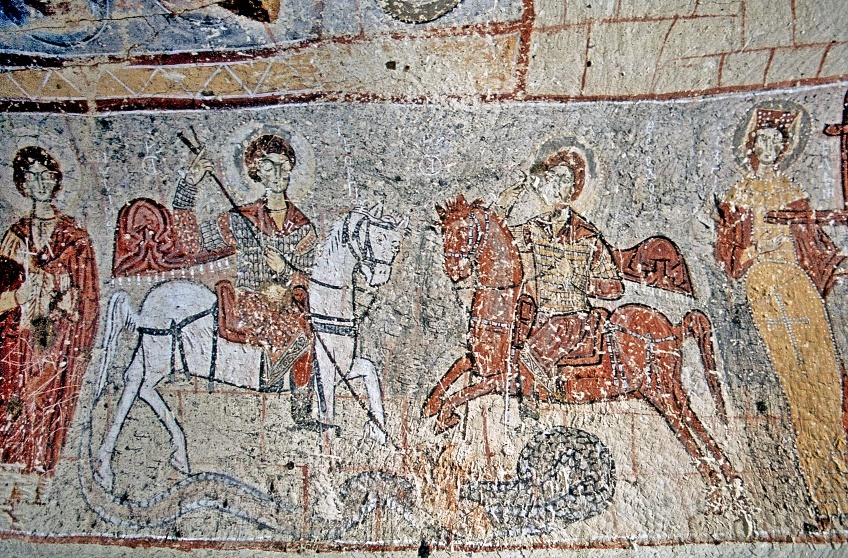
The Yılanlı Kilise fresco of saints Theodore and George slaying the dragon

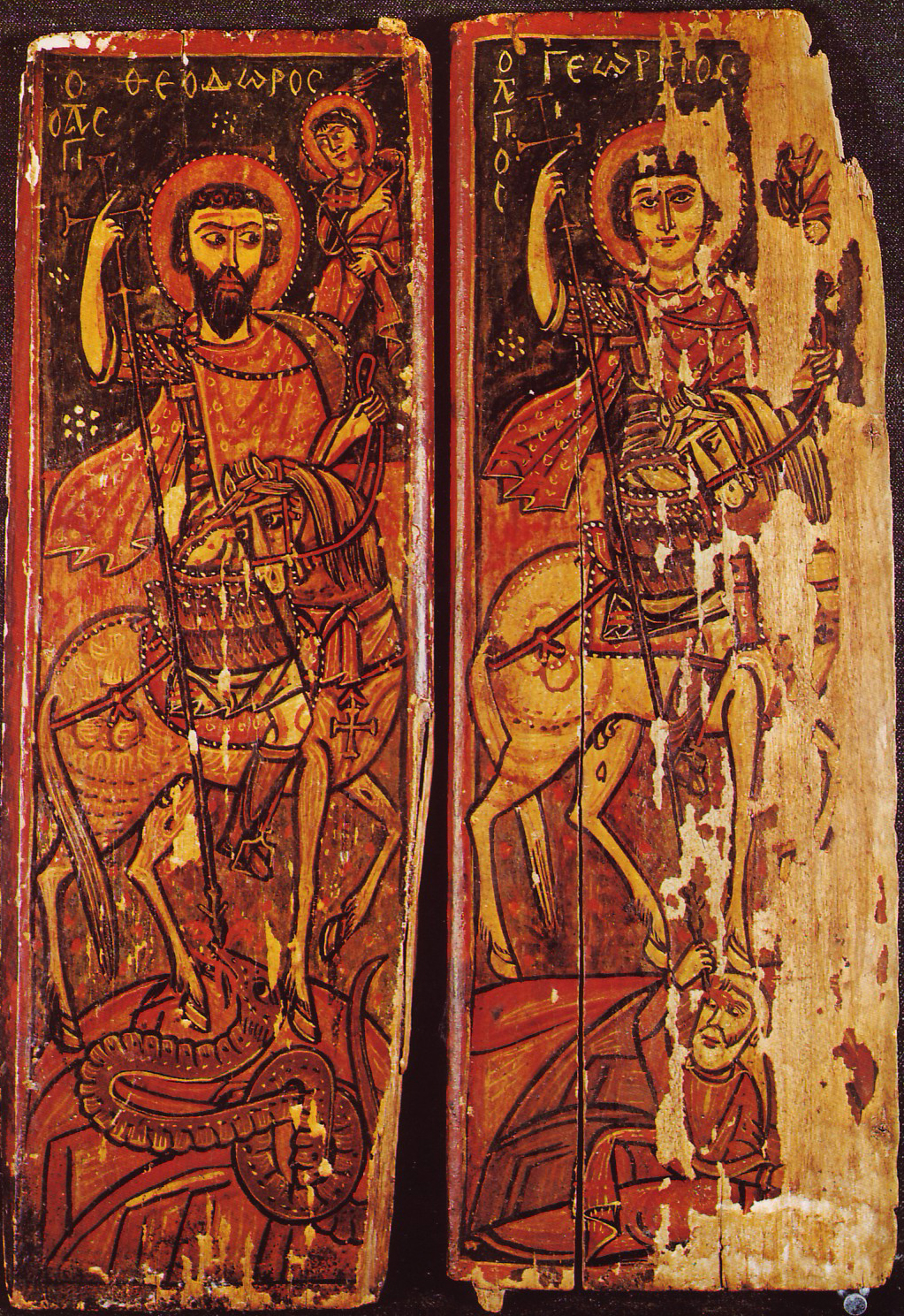
Saints Theodore and George shown side by side as equestrian heroes. Theodore kills a dragon and George a human enemy. Saint Catherine's Monastery, Sinai, 9th or 10th century

Iconography of a horseman with a spear overcoming evil as personified as a dragon was widespread throughout the Christian period. Iconographic representations of St Theodore as dragon-slayer are dated to as early as the 7th century, certainly by the early 10th century (the oldest certain depiction of Theodore killing a dragon is at Aghtamar, dated c. 920). Theodore is reported as having destroyed a dragon near Euchaita in a legend not younger than the late 9th century. The earliest image of St Theodore as a horseman (named in Latin) is from Vinica, North Macedonia and, if genuine, dates to the 6th or 7th century. Here, Theodore is not slaying a dragon, but holding a draco standard.

The "Christianisation" of the Thracian horseman iconography can be traced to the Cappadocian cave churches of Göreme, where frescoes of the 10th century show military saints on horseback confronting serpents with one, two or three heads. One of the earliest examples is from the church known as Mavrucan 3 (Güzelöz, Yeşilhisar), generally dated to the 10th century, which portrays two "sacred riders" confronting a two serpents twined around a tree, in a striking parallel to the Dioskuroi stela, except that the riders are now attacking the snake in the "tree of life" instead of a boar. In this example, at least, there appear to be two snakes with separate heads, but other examples of 10th-century Cappadocia show polycephalous snakes. A poorly preserved wall-painting at the Yılanlı Kilise ("Snake Church") that depicts the two saints Theodore and George attacking a dragon has been tentatively dated to the 10th century, or alternatively even to the mid-9th. A similar example, but showing three equestrian saints, Demetrius, Theodore and George, is from the "Zoodochos Pigi" chapel in central Macedonia in Greece, in the prefecture of Kilkis, near the modern village of Kolchida, dated to the 9th or 10th century.

A 12th-century depiction of Theodore as equestrian dragon-slayer is found in four muqarna panels in the nave of the Cappella Palatina in Palermo.

The dragon motif was transferred to the George legend from that of his fellow soldier saint, Saint Theodore Tiro. The transfer of the dragon iconography from Theodore, or Theodore and George as "Dioskuroi" to George on his own, first becomes tangible in the early 11th century. The oldest certain images of St. George combatting the serpent date are still found in Cappadocia, in particular the image in the church of Saint Barbara, Soganh (dated 1006 or 1021).

=== The two Theodores ===
The emergence of Theodore Stratelates as a separate saint is attested from the late 9th century. The two Theodores were frequently depicted alongside one another in the later Byzantine period. Theodore Stratelates had a shrine at Euchaneia, but was said to have originally been from Euchaita. His "lives" are listed in Bibliotecha Hagiographica Graeca 1760–1773.

Numerous conflicting legends grew up about the life and martyrdom of St Theodore so that, in order to bring some consistency into the stories, it seems to have been assumed that there must have been two different saints, St Theodore Tiron of Amasea and St Theodore Stratelates of Heraclea. (Note: Butler had mentioned the likelihood that there was only one saint, probably a martyr and possibly a soldier, pointing out that the legends overlapped and could not be distinguished. His 20th-century editor Thurston cited Delehaye. For other theories of the origin of Stratelates and a review of the relationship between the two saints, see Walter.)

There is much confusion between these two saints, and each of them is sometimes said to have had a shrine at Euchaita in Pontus. In fact the shrine existed before any distinction was made between these two saints. The separate shrine of Stratelates was at Euchaneia, a different place. (Note: Walter shows that Delehaye was mistaken in thinking them the same place.) They were distinguished at least by the 9th century. However it is now generally accepted, at least in the west, that there was in fact only one St Theodore. Delehaye wrote in 1909 that the existence of the second Theodore had not been historically established, and Walter in 2003 wrote that "the Stratelates is surely a fiction". Blackburn et al. treat the second figure as a promotion in rank of the former.

There were several churches dedicated to both saints, Theodore Tiron and Theodore Stratelates. For instance at Dobarsko and at Serres, at the monastery of Kuprianou at Constantinople and at Pergamon.

== Veneration ==
The veneration of St Theodore is attested by the late 4th century, when Gregory of Nyssa preached an encomium or homily in his honor at his sanctuary in the winter of 381. It is uncertain if this sanctuary was located at Amasea or Euchaita, but a church at Euchaita related to pilgrimage in Theodore's honor is known to have existed from at least c. 400. His cult spread rapidly and he became highly popular. The patriarch Nectarius preached a sermon on Theodore at Constantinople before 397. There was a church dedicated to him in Constantinople in 452, a mosaic created of him at Rome's Church of SS Cosmas & Damian c. 530, and San Teodoro al Palatino, a separate circular church in his honor at the foot of the Palatine, was consecrated in the 6th or 7th century.

The initial center of veneration was in the district around Amasea. From at least the 9th century (and possibly much earlier), Euchaita housed the relics of the saint and became an important place of pilgrimage, to the point it was also known as Theodoropolis. In a tradition recorded in the 10th or 11th century, a woman from Euchaita named Eusebia had transferred the saint's relics according to his wishes. The same tradition also associates Theodore with the dragon slayer motif. In the late 11th century, the Amasea province was gradually overwhelmed by the Turkish invasion and Euchaita became depopulated.

St Theodore became especially important in the Eastern Orthodox Church, where his cult spread widely. Gregory of Nyssa said nothing about St Theodore's life beyond the basic legend as given above, but he told how he could influence the lives of his hearers and specifically mentioned that he could intervene in battles. This became a particularly important attribute of St Theodore. Theodore was one of the important military saints of Byzantium and eventually had 15 churches in his honor in Constantinople. He was also widely venerated in Asia Minor, Syria, and Palestine and there are churches dedicated to him in Jerusalem and Damascus. The oldest Georgian Bir el Qutt inscriptions mention him twice. After the period of iconoclasm, from the 9th century, he was depicted as a soldier in military dress. A tradition origating in Cappadocia from the 9th or 10th century depicted him as dragon-slayer alongside Saints Demetrius and George. He was adopted as a military saint by the crusaders.

In Western Europe, Theodore was the patron saint of Venice during its period under Byzantine hegemony and the doge's chapel was dedicated to him until the 9th century, when Venice largely replaced him with St Mark as a sign of its growing independence. His cult spread during the Crusades. His body was said to have been transferred to Brindisi in the 12th century, after which he was honored as that city's patron. Gaeta claimed to have taken his head. Chartres Cathedral in France has a 13th-century stained glass window with 38 panels depicting Theodore's life, but his cult did not become common beyond Italy.

San Teodoro in Rome was made a collegiate church by Pope Felix IV and was made available to the Orthodox by Pope John Paul II in 2000, with services beginning in 2004.

=== Iconography ===
In mosaics and icons, he is most often shown in military dress from the 6th century, but sometimes in civilian or court dress. When on horseback, he is always in military dress, possibly spearing a dragon, and often accompanied by St George. Both he and St Theodore Stratelates are shown with thick black hair and pointed beards, usually one point for Theodore Tiron and two points for Stratelates.

His encounter with a dragon was increasingly transferred to the more-widely venerated Saint George beginning in the 13th century.

=== Feast days ===
In the Eastern church, St Theodore of Amasea is celebrated on 8 February in the Slavonic Byzantine calendar or on 17 February or on the 1st Saturday in Lent. In the western church, his date was 9 November but, since 1969 after the Second Vatican Council, he is no longer liturgically celebrated except in certain local calendars.

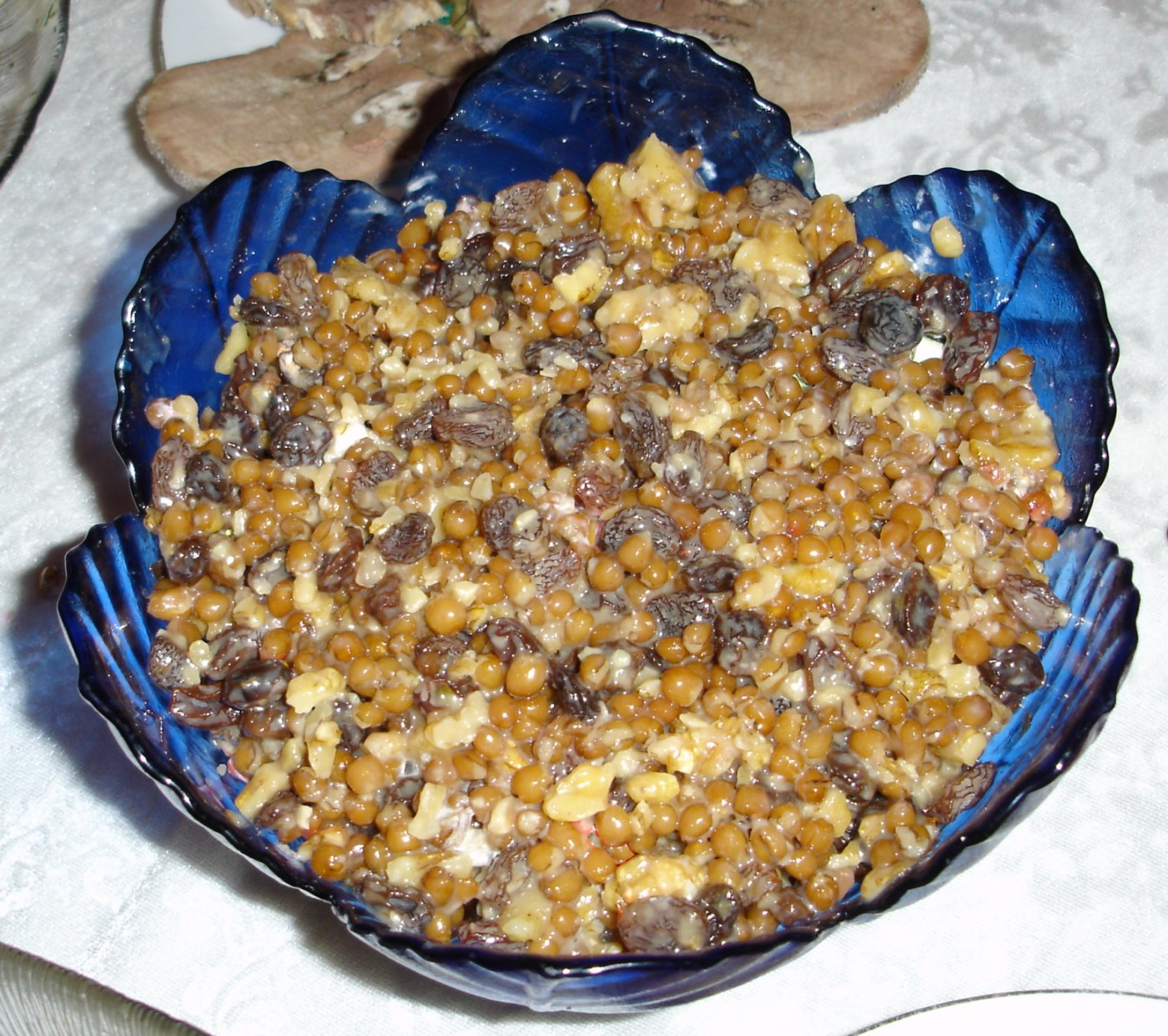
A dish of kolyva, of the type blessed on Saint Theodore Saturday.

The Eastern Orthodox Church and those Eastern Catholic churches which follow the Byzantine Rite, celebrate a miracle attributed to St. Theodore Tyro on the First Saturday of Great Lent. At the end of the Presanctified Liturgy on Friday evening (since, liturgically, the day begins at sunset) a special canon to St. Theodore, composed by St. John of Damascus, is chanted. Then the priest blesses kolyva (boiled wheat with honey and raisins) which is distributed to the faithful in commemoration of the following miracle worked by St. Theodore on the First Saturday of Great Lent:

Fifty years after the death of St Theodore, the emperor Julian the Apostate (361-363) commanded the governor of Constantinople during the first week of Great Lent to sprinkle all the food provisions in the marketplace with the blood offered to pagan idols, knowing that the people would be hungry after the strict fasting of the first week. Thus he would force the Christians to unknowingly eat food "polluted" (from the Christian perspective) with the blood of idolatry. St Theodore appeared in a dream to the Archbishop of Constantinople, Eudoxius, ordering him to inform all the Christians that no one should buy anything at the market, but rather to boil the wheat they had at home and eat it sweetened with honey.

After the service, the kolyva is distributed to all who are present and, after Holy Communion and the antidoron, is the first food eaten after the strict fasting of the first week.

=== Venice ===
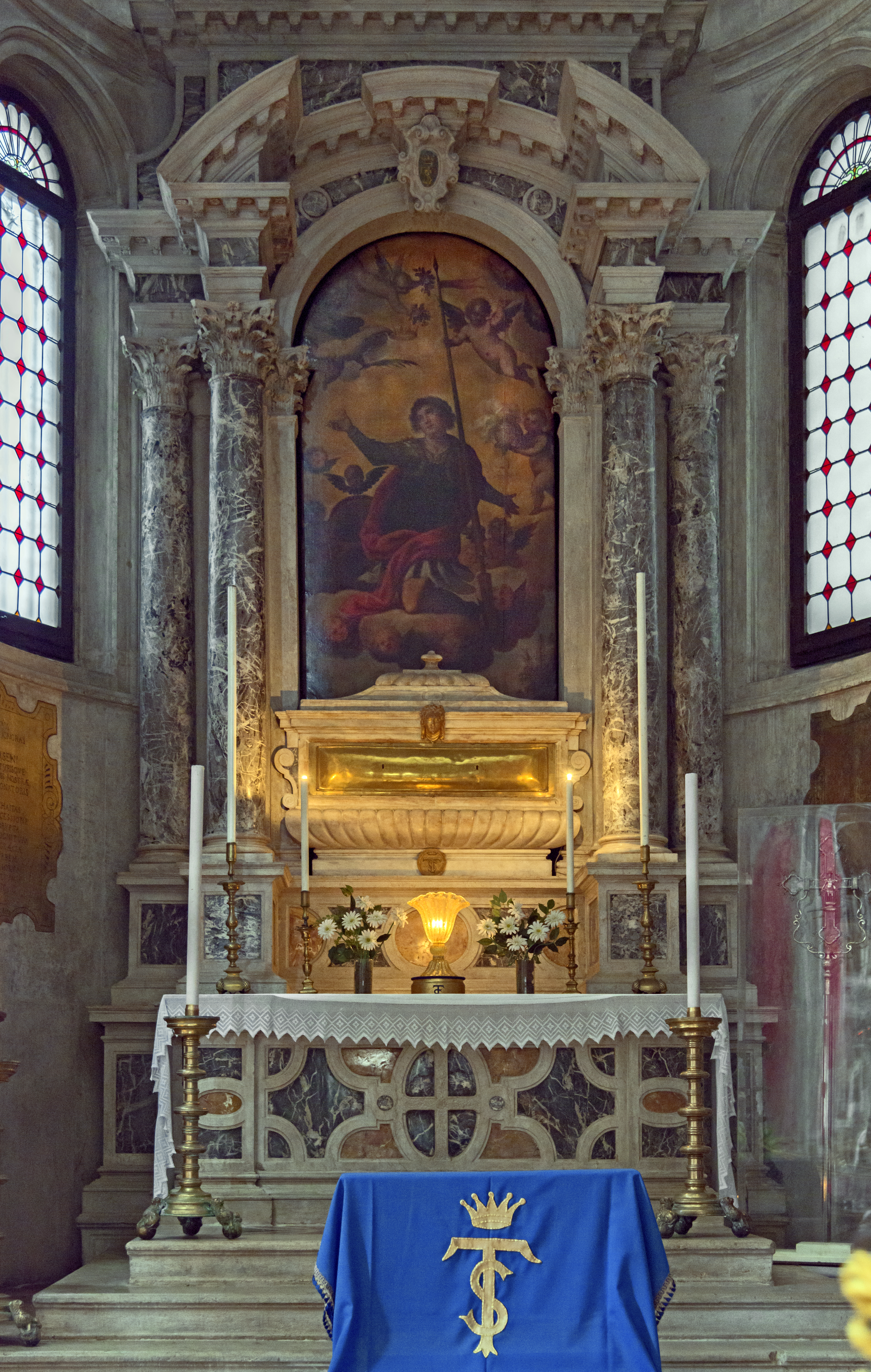
Tomb in San Salvador, Venice

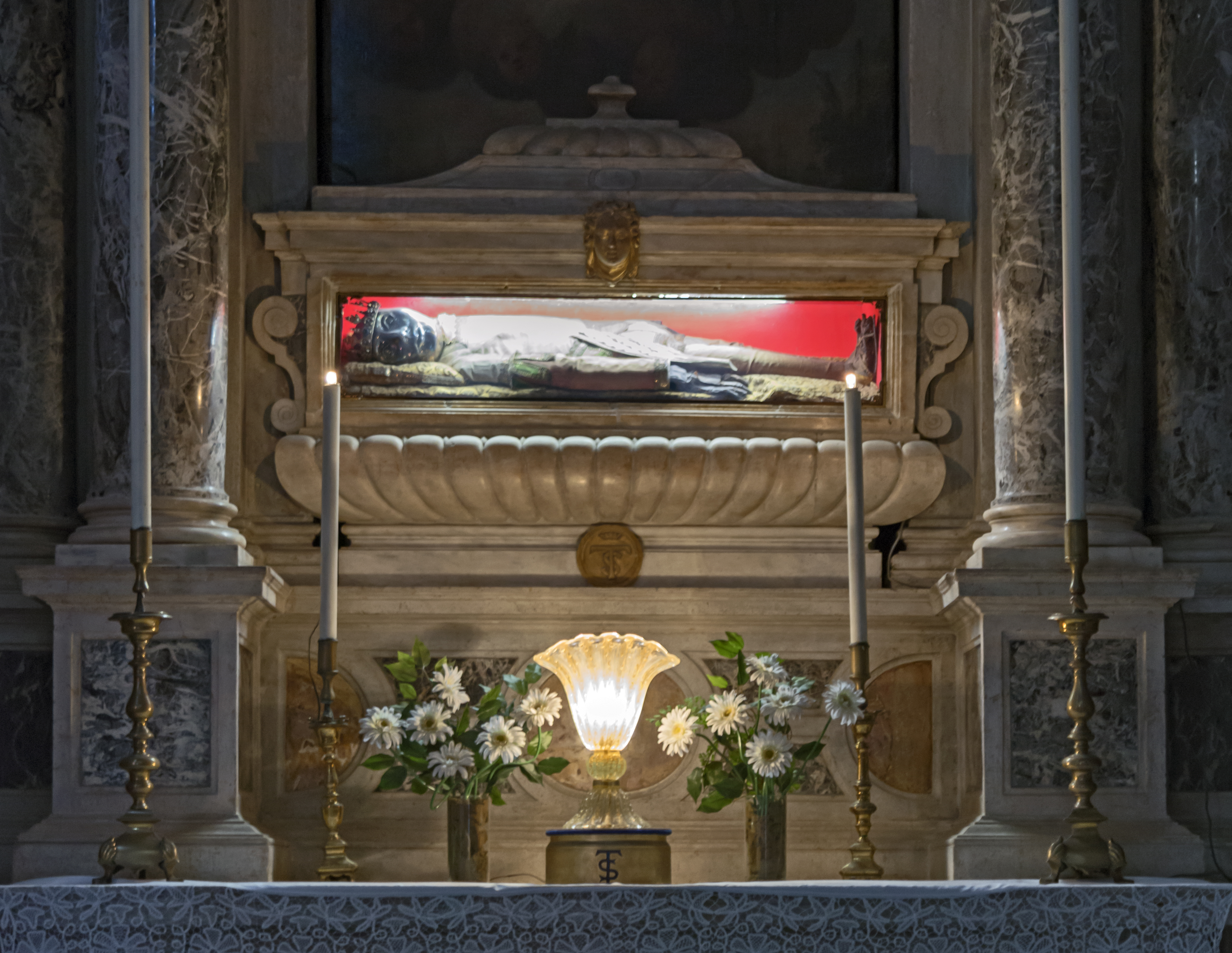
Theodore Tiron

St Theodore was the patron saint of Venice before the relics of Saint Mark were (according to tradition) brought to the city in 828. The original chapel of the Doge was dedicated to St Theodore, though, after the translation of the relics of St Mark, it was superseded by the church of St Mark.

There is some doubt whether this first patron of Venice was Theodore of Amasea or Theodore of Heraclea, although Otto Demus opted emphatically for the latter in 1960 and was followed in this by Fenlon. However, Demus later noted that none of the 12th-century mosaics which show St Theodore mentions more than his name and that he may have become the patron of the city before the two saints were distinguished. In fact the Venetians never appear to have made any distinction between the different St Theodores. None of the mosaics in Venice's St Mark's Basilica show him in military dress.

There were 15 churches in Constantinople dedicated to St Theodore, who was a Greek saint, specially venerated by the Eastern church. Venice had originally been a subject city of the Eastern Roman Empire, and the Venetians saw St Theodore as a symbol of their subjection to Constantinople. The adoption of St Mark as their patron helped to establish their independence.

The new church of St Mark was built between the old chapel of St Theodore and the Ducal Palace. When this was enlarged and rebuilt in the late 11th century, the chapel of St Theodore disappeared in the rebuilding. There is today a small chapel dedicated to St Theodore, behind St Mark's church, but this was not built until 1486. (It was later occupied by the Inquisition in Venice).

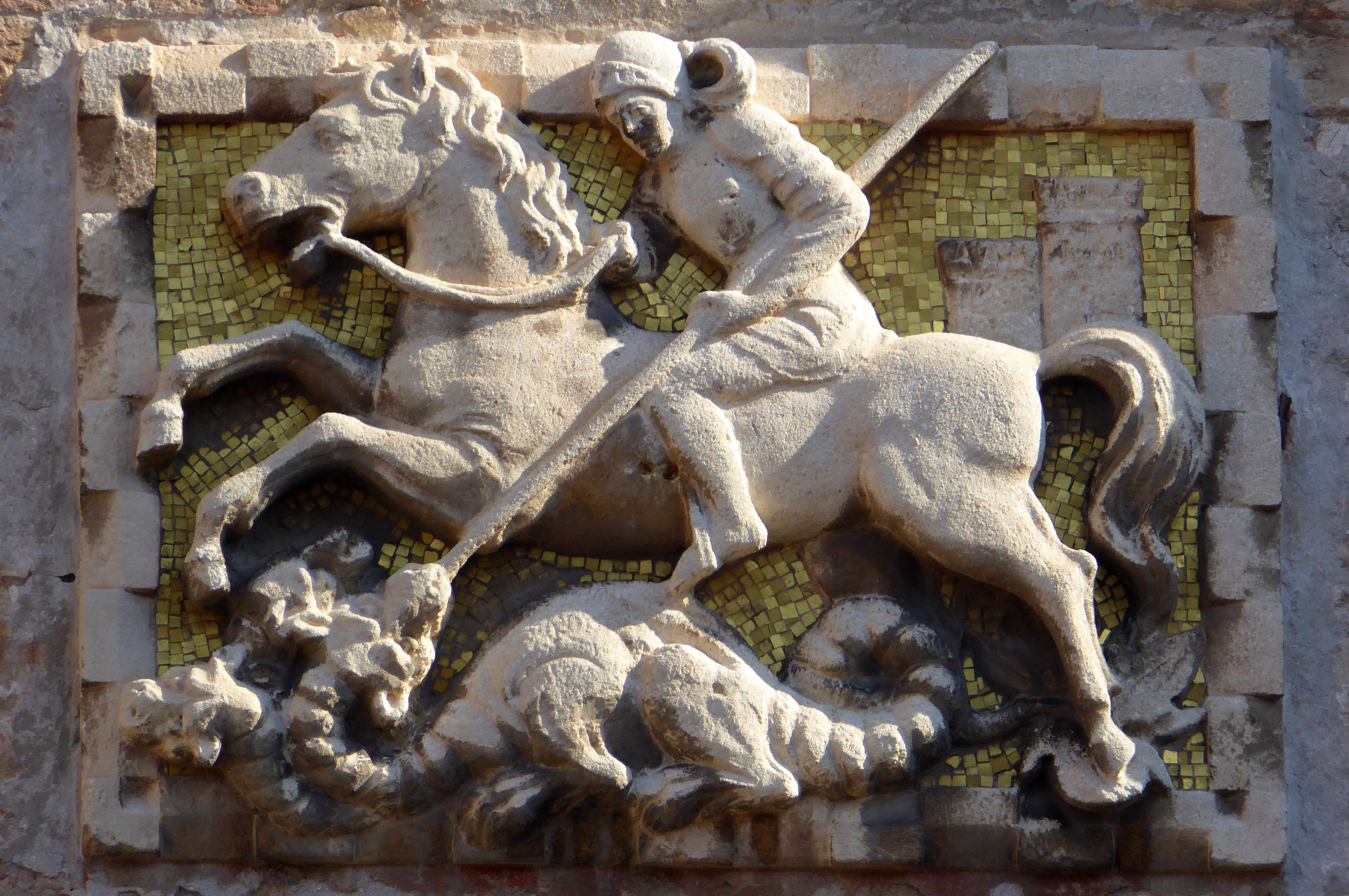
Sculpture of St Theodore in Venice

The two Byzantine columns in the Piazzetta in Venice were set up soon after 1172. The eastern column bears a strange animal representing the winged lion of St Mark. A statue representing St Theodore was placed on the western column in 1372, but this was not the statue now to be seen there, which is a composite of several fragments, some antique, including a crocodile to represent a dragon, and was placed there in the second half of the 15th century. The statue on the pillar is now a copy of the original, which is kept elsewhere for its preservation.

Reputed relics of St Theodore were taken from Mesembria by a Venetian admiral in 1257 and, after being first placed in a Venetian church in Constantinople, were brought to Venice in 1267. They were placed in the church of San Salvatore.

== Gallery ==
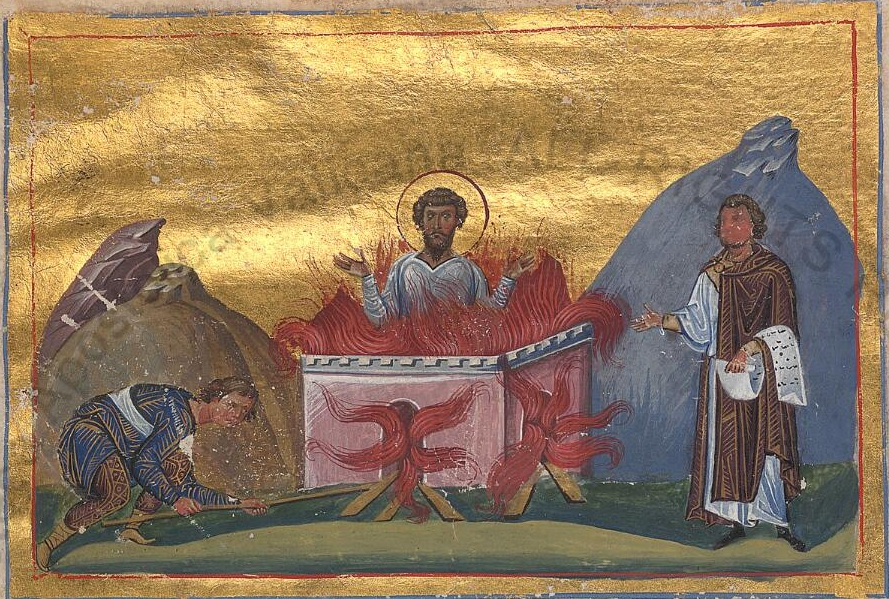
St Theodore in the Menologion of Basil II (11th cent.)

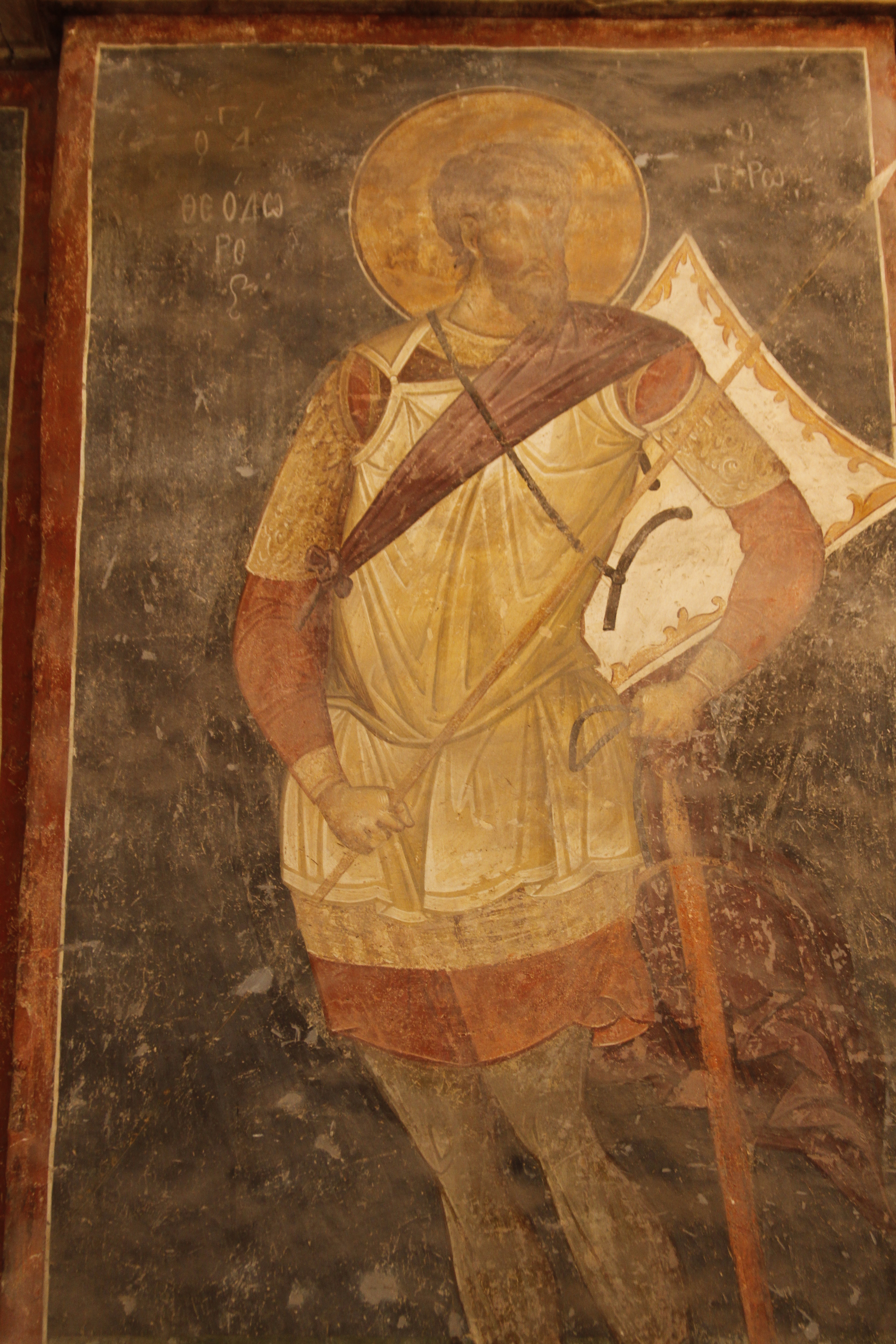
St Theodore in a fresco at Chora Church in Istanbul, Turkey (12th cent.)

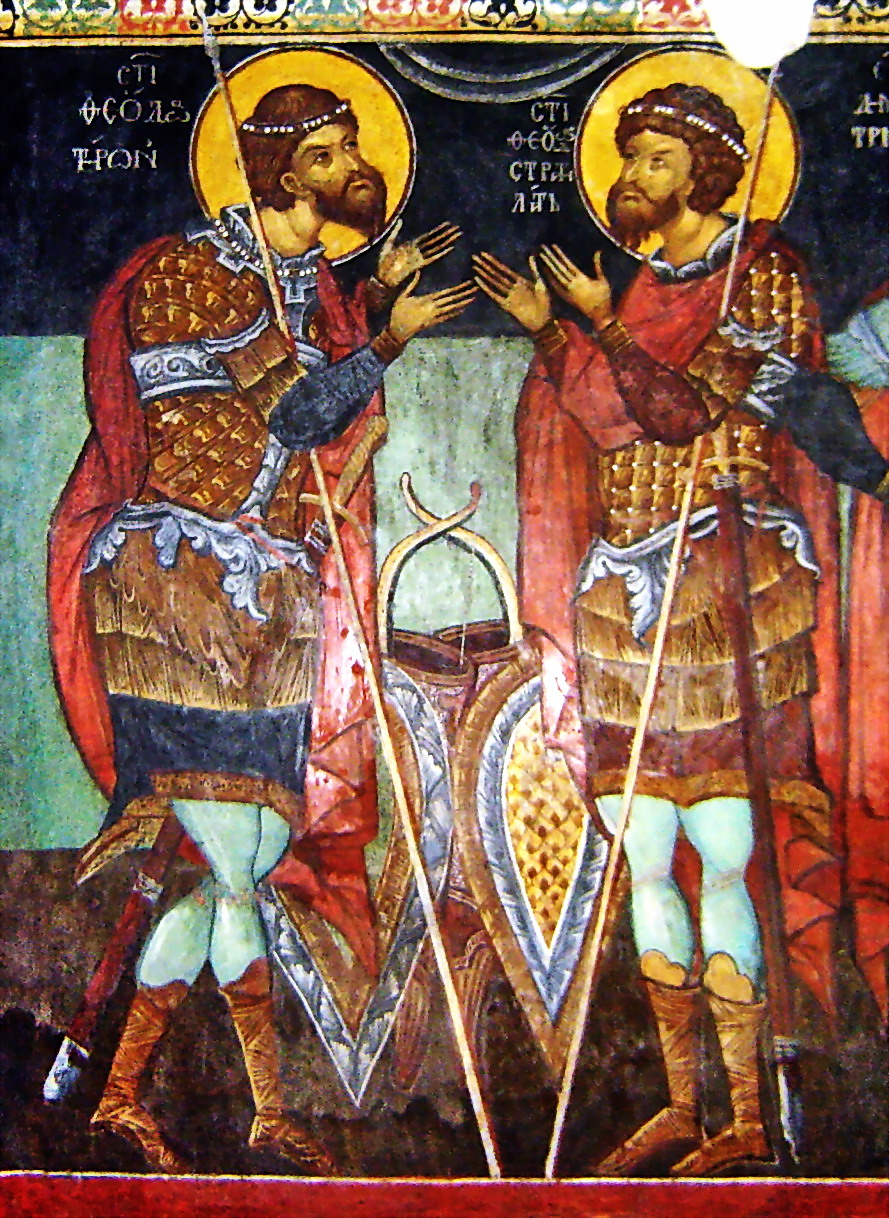
SS Theodore of Amasea (left) and Theodore of Heraclea (right) in a fresco at Kremikovtsi Monastery, Bulgaria (c. 16th cent.)

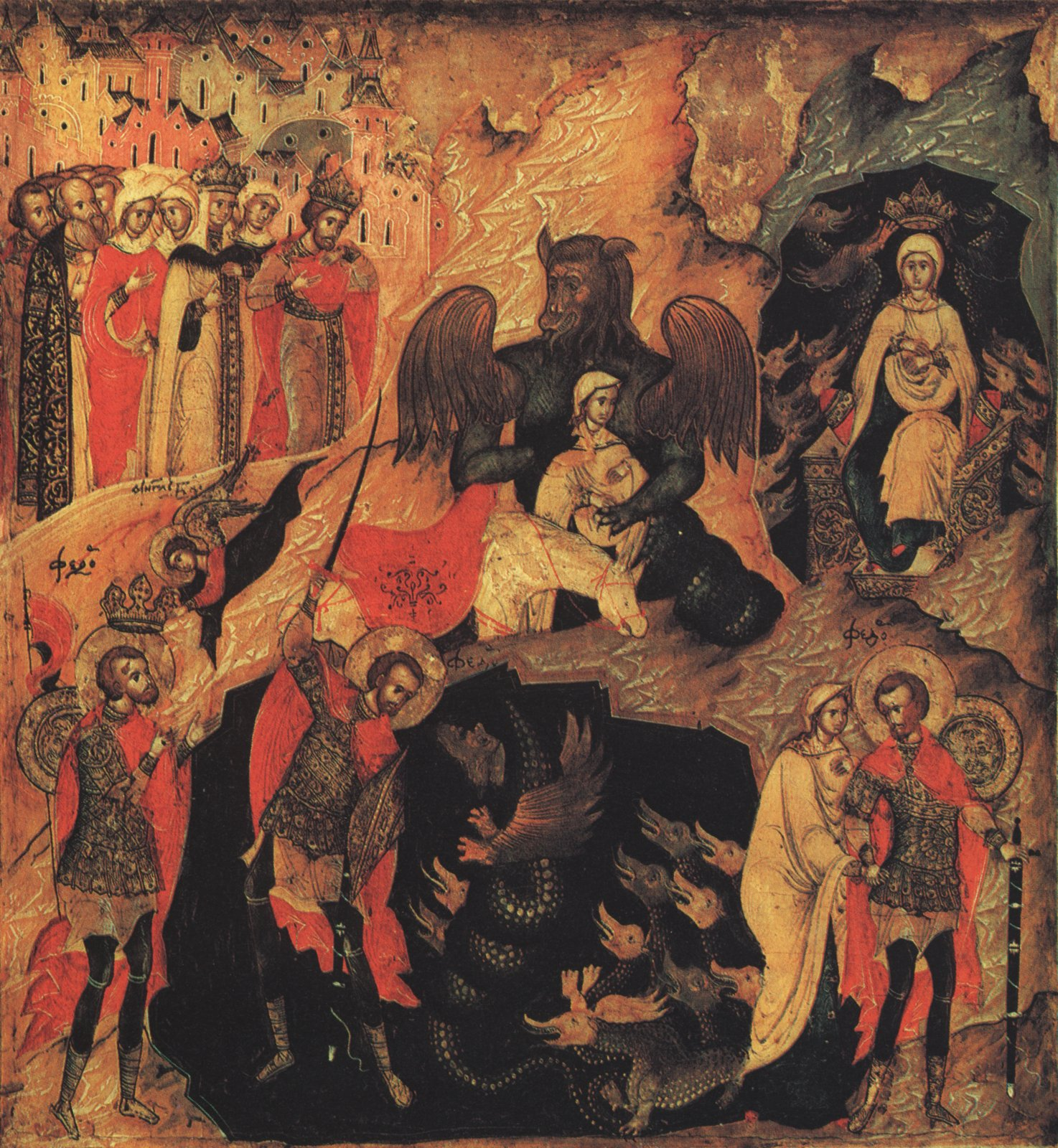
Russian icon of the Miracle of St Theodore (17th cent.)

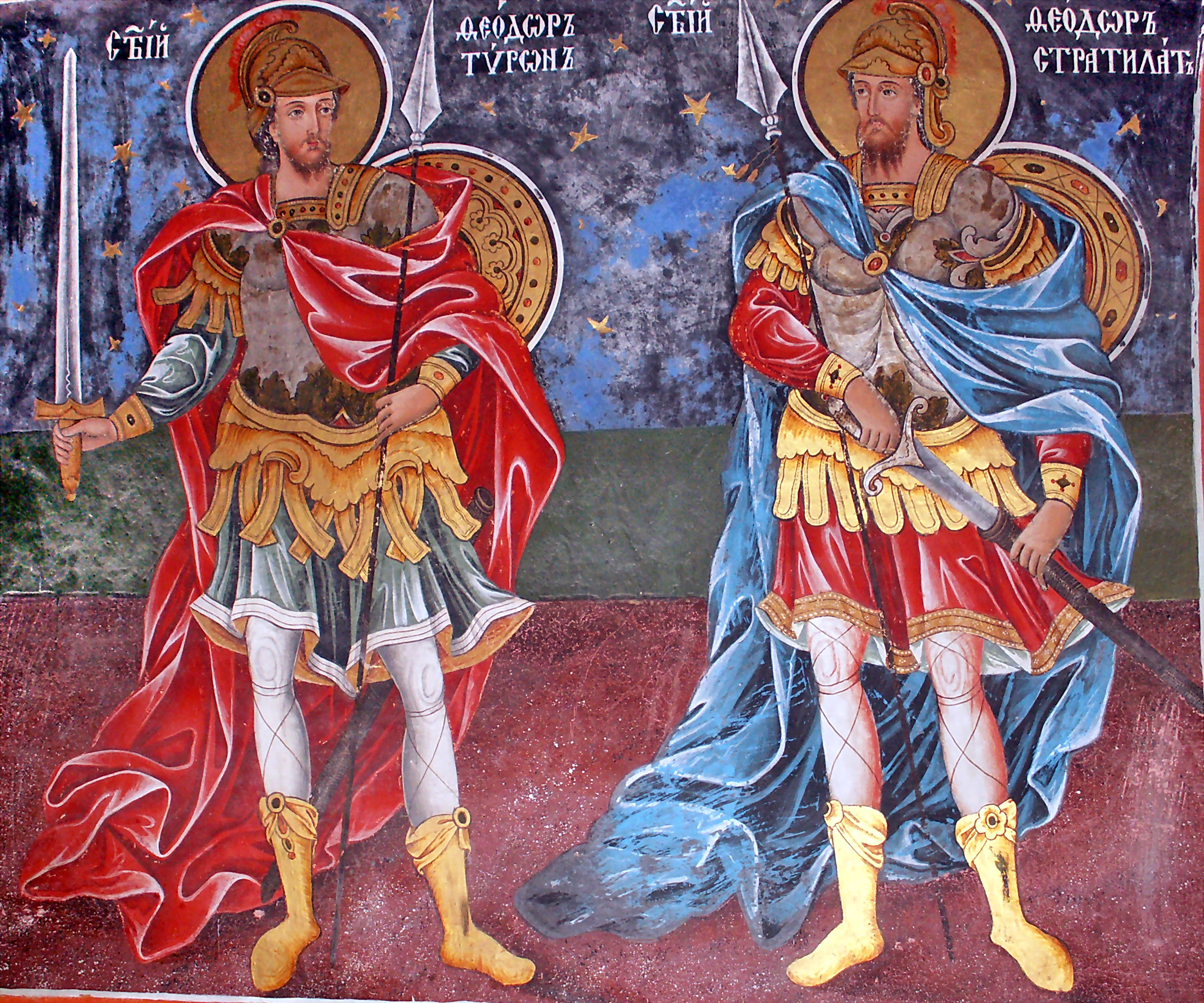
SS Theodore of Amasea (left) and Theodore of Heraclea (right) in a fresco at Rila Monastery, Bulgaria (c. 19th cent.)

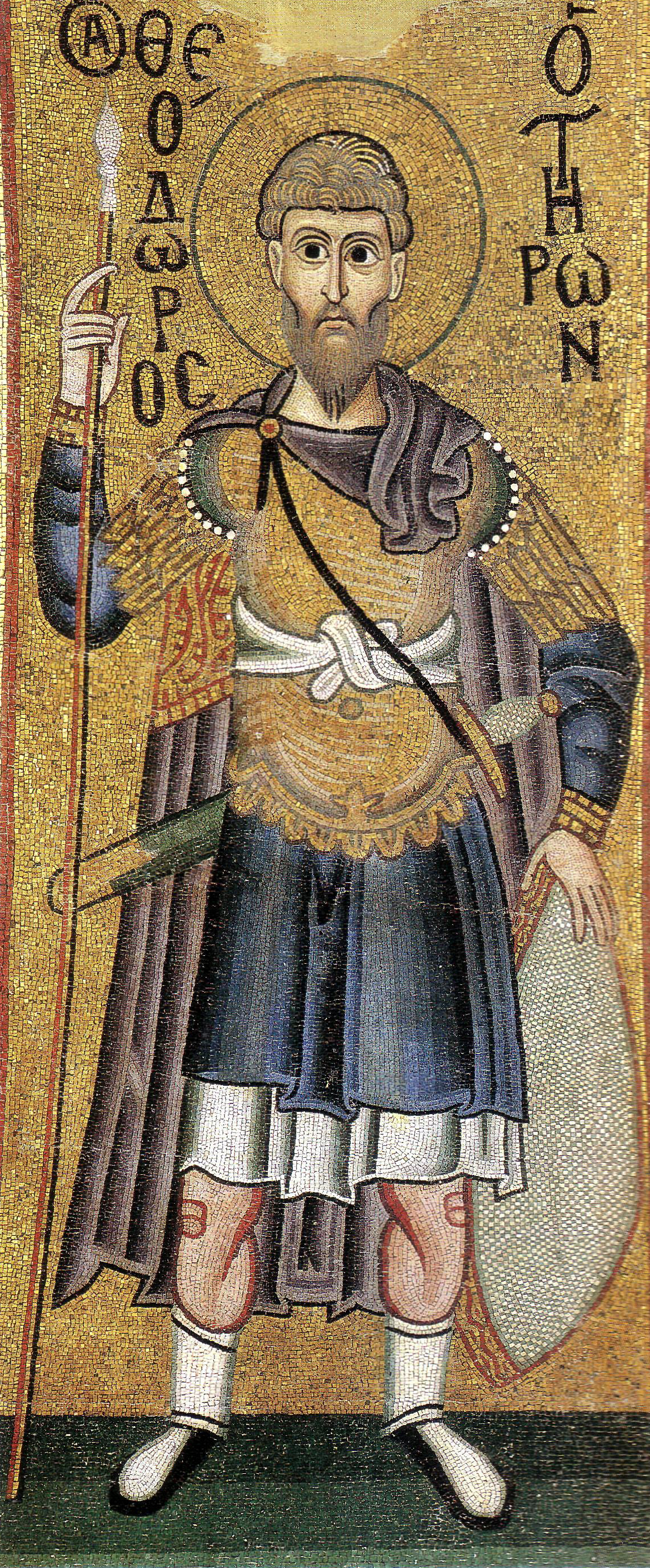
Mosaic from Hosios Loukas

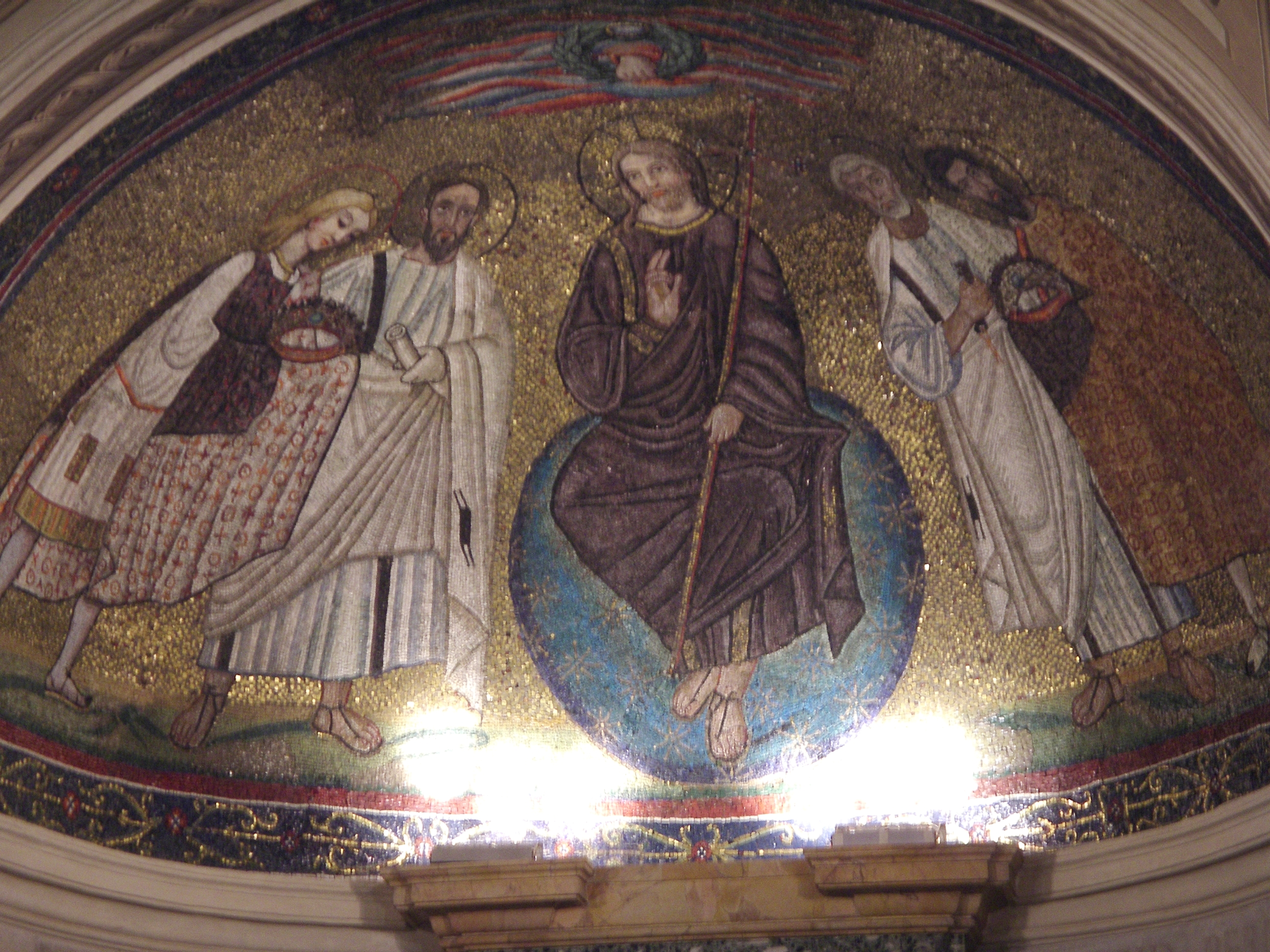
Mosaic from San Teodoro, Rome

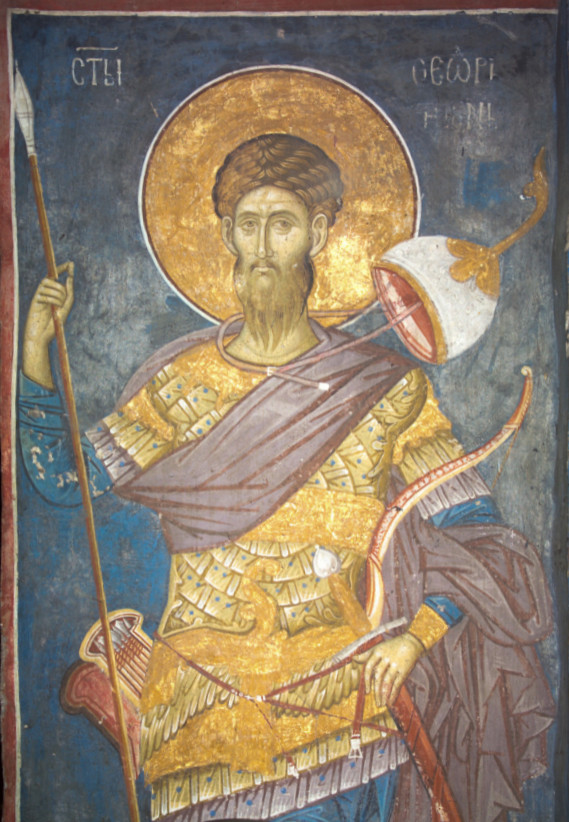
Fresco from Visoki Dečani

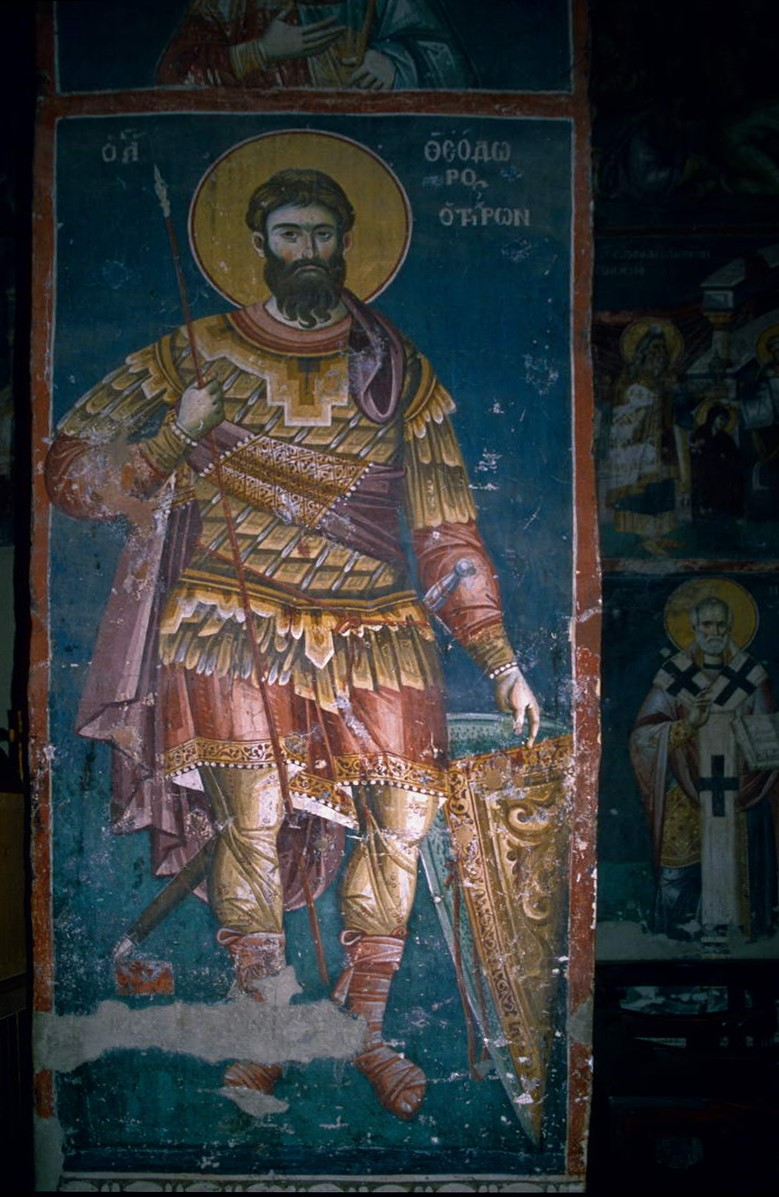
Fresco from the Church of St. Mary Peribleptos, Ohrid

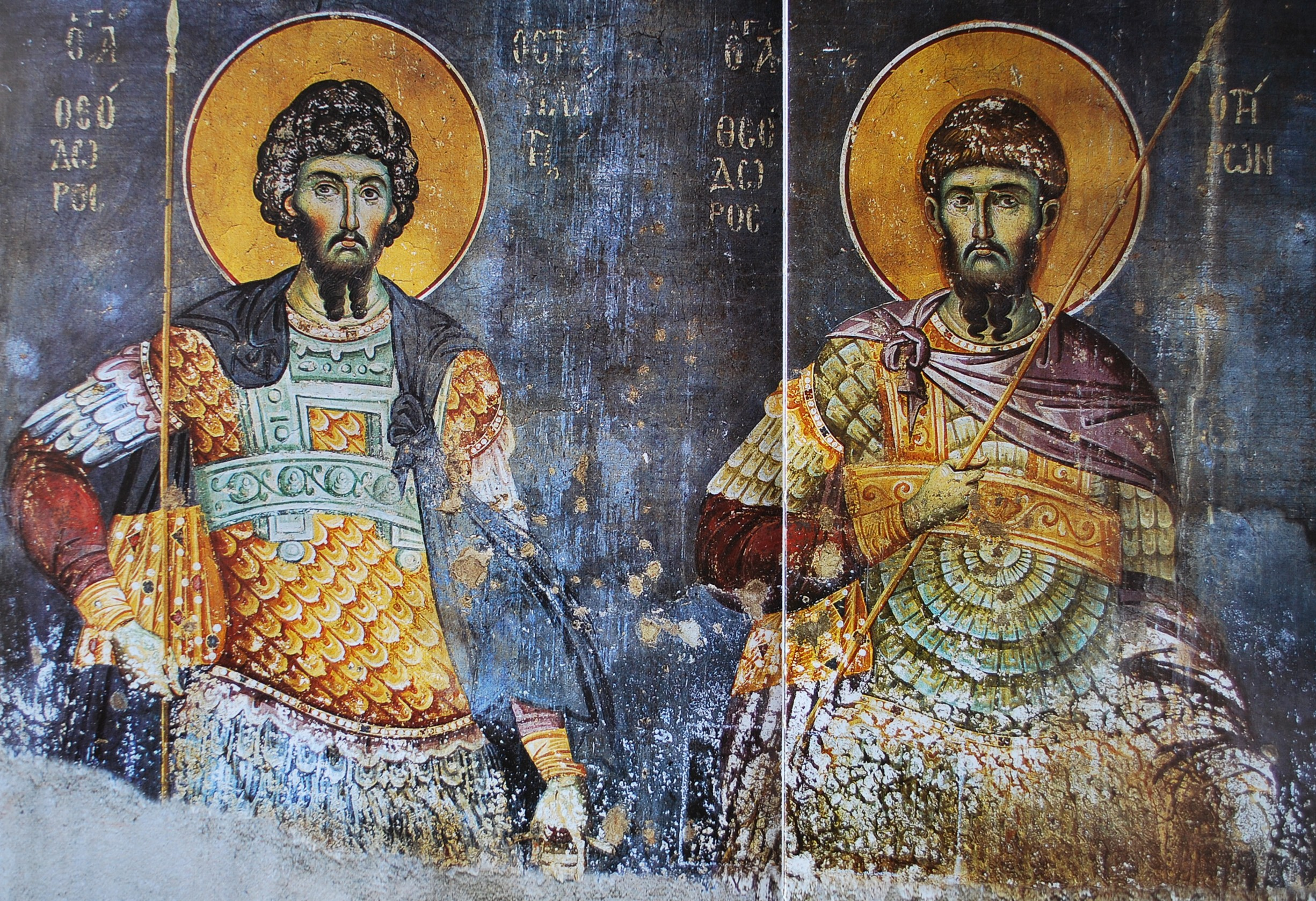
Fresco of the Saint Theodores from Protaton, Mount Athos

== See also ==
- Moreška, dance performed on Sveti Todor (Saint Theodore's) day on the Croatian island of Korčula
- Theodore the Martyr
- Saints Theodore Tyro and Theodore Stratelates Church, Serres
