= Beyözü, Mecitözü =

Village in Turkey

Beyözü
- Village
- Location in Turkey
- Coordinates: 40°34′N 35°16′E
- Country: Turkey
- Province: Çorum
- District: Mecitözü
- Population (2022): 314
- Time zone: UTC+3 (TRT)

Beyözü is a village in the Mecitözü District of Çorum Province in Turkey. Its population is 314 (2022). It is close to the site of the ancient city of Euchaita. In 1921, its name was mentioned and recorded as Avkat. This name is a corruption of the name Euchaita.
