= Tadros =

Tadros

== Religion ==
- Tadros of Shotep or Theodore Stratelates or Theodore of Heraclea, martyr and Warrior Saint venerated with the title Great-martyr in the Eastern Orthodox Church, Eastern Catholic and Roman Catholic Churches and Oriental Orthodox Churches

== Persons ==
Notable people with the surname include:

- Albert Tadros (1914–1993), Egyptian basketball player
- Aly Tadros (born 1986), American singer-songwriter
- Manuel Tadros (born 1956), Canadian singer, songwriter, actor
- Monica Tadros (born 1974), American plastic and reconstructive surgeon
- Sherine Tadros, British journalist
- Wendy A. Tadros, Canadian civil servant and administrator
- Xavier Dolan-Tadros (born 1989), sometimes just Xavier Dolan, Canadian actor

== Music ==
- Tadros (duo), a Canadian musical group made up of brothers Daniel and Eric Tadros
