= Thoros =

Thoros, alternative transliteration T'oros, is the Armenian variant of the Greek name Theodoros (Theodore). It may refer to:

== Historical figures ==
Chronologically:

- Thoros of Edessa (died 1098)
- Thoros I of Armenia (ruling 1102–1129)
- Thoros II of Armenia (ruling 1140–1169)
- Thoros III of Armenia (ruling 1293–1298)
- Thoros the Younger (ruling 1303/05–1307), alternate term for Leo III, King of Armenia, son of Thoros III

== Fiction ==
- Thoros of Myr, a character in George R. R. Martin's A Song of Ice and Fire

== See also ==
- Toros (disambiguation)
- Theodore (disambiguation)
- Theodoros, a given name
