= Theodore (surname) =

Theodore is an English masculine given name and surname. It comes from the Greek name Θεόδωρος (Theodōros) meaning "God's gift" (from the Greek words Θεός, (theos) "God" and δώρον (dōron) "gift"). The name was popular among early Christians and was borne by several saints.

Notable people with the surname include:

- Bradley Theodore, Visual artist
- José Théodore (born 1976), Canadian ice hockey goaltender
- Joseph Davilmar Théodore (1847–1917), President of Haiti
- Jon Theodore (born 1973), American ex-drummer for The Mars Volta
- Jordan Theodore (born 1989), American basketball player
- Ouigi Theodore (born c.1975), American fashion designer
- Patrick Theodore (born 1996), Australian professional soccer player
- Shea Theodore (born 1995), Canadian ice hockey player
- Stephen Theodore (footballer) (born 1950), Australian rules footballer
- Ted Theodore (1884–1950), Australian politician

== See also ==
- Theodore (disambiguation)
- Theodore (given name), etymology of the name and list of persons with the given name Theodore and variants
