= Theodore =

Theodore may refer to:

== Places ==
- Theodore, Australian Capital Territory, Australia
- Theodore, Queensland, Australia
- Theodore, Saskatchewan, Canada
- Theodore, Alabama, United States
- Theodore Reservoir, in Saskatchewan

== People ==
- Theodore (given name), including a list of people with the name
- Theodore (surname), including a list of people with the name

== Other uses ==
- Theodore (horse), a British Thoroughbred racehorse
- Theodore Racing, a Formula One constructor

== See also ==
- Theodoros, or Theodorus
- Principality of Theodoro, a former principality in Crimea
- Thoros (disambiguation), Armenian for Theodore
