= Euchaita =

Ancient town in modern Turkey

Euchaita (Εὐχάϊτα), alternatively called Evkaite or Avkat, was a Byzantine city and diocese in Helenopontus, the Armeniac Theme (northern Asia Minor), and an important stop on the Ancyra-Amasea Roman road.

Euchaita gained prominence during the later Roman and Byzantine periods as a significant cultic center for the veneration of Anatolian saint Theodore Tiron. Between the 7th and 11th centuries, following the early Muslim conquests, it transitioned into a military outpost. However, with the Turkish conquest of Anatolia in the late 11th century, Euchaita's importance diminished. In Ottoman times, Euchaita was mostly depopulated, but there was a remnant village known as Avhat or Avkat.

Today the Turkish village Beyözü, in the Anatolian province of Çorum (in the subprovince of Mecitözü, Turkey), partly lies on the ruins.

== History ==
Euchaita, in the Roman province of Helenopontus (civil diocese of Pontus) is known mostly due to its role as a major pilgrimage site dedicated to Saint Theodore of Amasea (martyred c. 306).

Its episcopal see was originally a suffragan (no incumbents known) of the Metropolitan of the provincial capital Amasea, in the sway of patriarchate of Constantinople. In the 5th century, the town was a favourite site of exile for disgraced senior churchmen. In 515, the unfortified town was sacked by a Hunnic raid, after which it was rebuilt, fortified and raised to the status of a city by Anastasius I Dicorus (r. 491–518).

It became an autocephalous archbishopric in the early 7th century, as attested by the Notitia Episcopatuum edition of pseudo-Epiphanius, from the reign of Byzantine emperor Heraclius I (circa 640). The city was burned down by the Sassanid Persians in 615, and attacked by the Arabs under second Umayyad Caliph Mu'awiya I in 640. A second Arab attack captured the city in 663; the raiders plundered the city, destroyed the church of St. Theodore, and wintered there, while the population fled to fortified refuges in the surrounding countryside. The city was rebuilt and soon recovered. The Arabs scored a victory in its vicinity in 810, taking captive the local strategos of the Armeniac Theme and his entire treasury.

A hagiography of the 8th or 9th century claims that the relics of Saint Theodore were at this time still located at Amaseia, but that the Christians of Euchaita, with increasing persistence, were asking for their transfer to their own city, claiming that this had been the wish of the saint himself when he was alive. Euchaita became a full metropolitan see under Leo VI the Wise (r. 886–912) and Patriarch Photius of Constantinople, ranking 51st among the Metropolitanates of the Patriarchate, with four suffragan sees: Gazala, Koutziagra, Sibiktos and Bariané, but apparently lost them all no later than the 10th century.

In 972, Emperor John I Tzimiskes renamed the neighbouring Euchaneia, whose exact relation or identity with Euchaita is unclear, into Theodoropolis. The town is recorded as having a vibrant fair during the festival of St. Theodore in the middle of the 11th century. After the Battle of Manzikert Euchaita was at the frontier of the Turkoman invasions, and there are no more records about its fate. The settlement was most likely depopulated, and from the 12th century, it was within the Seljuk Sultanate.

By the 16th century, under Ottoman rule, the settlement of Avkat was largely abandoned but there was a dervish lodge or zawiya, dedicated to a sufi named Elwan Çelebi, on what were presumably the remnants of the church of Saint Theodore. When the German traveller Hans Dernschwam visited the site in 1555, he noted that the dervishes cultivated a remnant of the worship of St. Theodore as the dragon slayer, under the name of Khidr-Ilya. Dernschwam was shown by the dervishes the remains of the dragon slain by "Khidr", Greek inscriptions referring to Theodore, as well as a hoofprint and a spring made by his horse, and the tomb of Khidr's groom and his sister's son. Dernschwam also records the presence of the remnants of a church and other fragments of the ancient city. The mosque of Elwan Çelebi is now situated some 5km west of Beyözü (40.5665°N 35.1645°E, at the Çorum-Tokat road, D.180).

=== Episcopal Ordinaries ===
Bishops

- Peter Mongus (c. 447)
- Mamas (acceded under Anastasius I Dicorus, r. 491—518)
- unknown
- John (6th c.)
- unknown

Archbishops

- Epiphanios (before 681—later 692), attended the Ecumenical Third Council of Constantinople (680–681, which repudiated as heresies Monothelitism and Monoenergism) and the disciplinary Quinisext Council at Trullo in 692
- unknown
- Theophylact (in 787), participated in the Ecumenical Second Council of Nicaea in 787
- Peter (c. 7th/8th c.)

Metropolitans

- Euthymios (Euphemianos) (9th c.), expelled
- Euthymius (Euphemianus) (869/870—later 882/886), got a second term
- Theodorus Santabarenos (880—886)
- Symeon (9th c.)
- Philaretos (in 945)
- Philotheos (fl. 963—971), synkellos
- Theophilus (?—?)
- Symeon (early 11th c.)
- Michael (1028—1032)
- Manuel (Emmanuei) (11th c.), synkellos
- Eustratios
- John Mauropous (fl. 1047), protosynkellos
- Nikolaos (in 1054)
- Theodore (before 1082)
- Basil (1082—1092)
- unknown metropolitan (1157)
- Constantine (1161—1171)
- Leo (1173)
- unknown metropolitan (1185)
- Basil (1260)
- Alexius (1275)
- unknown metropolitan (1318)

Titular metropolitans

In 1327, the sees of Euchaita, Sebasteia and Iconion were unified with the see of Caesarea. From the 17th century, titular metropolitans were consecrated in Wallachia.

- Meletius (1632)
- Jacob (1656)
- Parthenius (1674)
- Joasaph (later 1674)
- unknown
- Synesius (1835—1840)
- vacant

=== Latin Titular archbishopric ===
The archbishopric was nominally restored in 1922 as Latin titular archbishopric of Eucaita. In 1925 it was demoted as titular bishopric of Eucaita, but before another incumbent could take possession it was in 1929 again promoted as titular archbishopric, now under the names Euchaitæ, Eucaita or Euchaitenus. There have been only three titular archbishops, between 1922 and 1972:

- Bernard Adriaan Gijlswijk (O.P.) (2 December 1922 – 22 December 1944)
- Octavio Antonio Beras Rojas (O.P.) (2 May 1945 – 10 December 1961)
- Bolesław Kominek (19 March 1962 – 28 June 1972).

== Archaeology ==
From 2006 to 2012, there were archaeological excavations led by John Haldon of Princeton University. The Avkat Archaeological Project was a collaboration between Princeton University, Trent University, the College of Charleston, the University of Birmingham, Ankara University and the Middle East Technical University (Ankara). The excavation report was published in 2018.
