= Bogdan =

- Gender: male

Origin
- Origin: Slavic
- Meaning: given by God
- Region of origin: Eastern Europe

Other names
- Related names: Bohdan, Božidar, Bożydar

Bogdan (Cyrillic: Богдан) is a Slavic masculine name that appears in the South Slavic languages and in Polish and Romanian. It is derived from the Slavic words Bog (Cyrillic: Бог), meaning 'god', and dan (Cyrillic: дан), meaning 'given'. The name appears to be an early calque from Greek Theódoros (Theodore, Theodosius) or Hebrew Matthew with the same meaning. The name is also used as a surname in Hungary, Romania, Serbia and Croatia. Bogdana is the feminine version of the name.

== Variations ==
The sound change of 'g' into 'h' (into Bohdan) occurred in the West Slavic languages and in Ukrainian. Both Bogdan and Bohdan are used in Poland.

Slavic variants include Bulgarian and Serbo-Croatian Božidar (Божидар) and Polish Bożydar, and diminutive forms and nicknames include Boguś, Bodya, Boca, Boci, Boća, Boša, Bogi, Bo, Boga Boga, Boggie. The feminine form is Bogdana, with variants such as Bogdanka.

Names with similar meanings include Persian Khodadad, Greek Theodore, Arabic Ataullah, Hebrew Nathaniel, Jonathan, and Matthew, Latin Deodatus, French Dieudonné, Spanish Diosdado and Sanskrit Devadatta.

== Name days ==
- Bulgarian: 6 January
- Croatian: 12 May
- Hungarian: 2 September
- Moldovan: 19 October
- Polish: 19 March, 17 July, 10 August or 9 October
- Orthodox Christianity: 4 March

== Given name ==
=== Medieval ===
- Bogdan I of Moldavia, Voivode of Moldavia (r. 1359–1365), and the House of Bogdan-Mușat (Bogdania was an early name for the principality of Moldavia, named after Bogdan I)
- Bogdan Kirizmić (fl. 1361–1371), Serbian financial manager in the service of Vukašin Mrnjavčević (fl. 1371)
- Bogdan (fl. 1363), kaznac in the service of Emperor Uroš V
- Bogdan (fl. 1407–1413), Serbian state financial manager under Despot Stefan Lazarević, merchant from Prizren and donator to Kalenić monastery
- Bogdan II of Moldavia, Voivode of Moldavia (r. 1449–1451)
- Bogdan III the One-Eyed, Voivode of Moldavia (r. 1504–1517)
- Petar Bogdan, Bulgarian Catholic cleric (1601–1674)

=== Sports ===
- Bogdan Aldea, Romanian footballer
- Bogdan Andone, Romanian footballer
- Bogdan Apostu, Romanian footballer
- Bogdan Bălan, Romanian rugby union player
- Bogdan Bogdanović (basketball), Serbian basketball player
- Bogdan Bucurică, Romanian footballer
- Bogdan Buhuș, Romanian footballer
- Bogdan Cistean, Romanian footballer
- Bogdan Ciufulescu, Romanian wrestler
- Bogdan Cotolan, Romanian footballer
- Bogdan Daras, Polish wrestler
- Mihai Bogdan Dobrescu, Romanian boxer
- Bogdan Juratoni, Romanian footballer
- Bogdan Lalić, Croatian chess grandmaster
- Bogdan Lobonț, Romanian footballer
- Bogdan Macovei (handball coach), Romanian handball coach
- Bogdan Macovei (luger), Romanian-Moldovan luger
- Bogdan Pătrașcu, Romanian footballer
- Bogdan Planić, Serbian footballer
- Bogdan Stelea, Romanian footballer
- Bogdan Stoica, Romanian kickboxer
- Bogdan Tanjević, Montenegrin basketball coach
- Bogdan Toropkin, Russian swimmer

=== Other ===
- Bogdan Baltazar, Romanian banker
- Bogdan Baranowski, Polish chemist
- Bogdan Bogdanović (architect), Serbian architect
- Bogdan Borusewicz, Polish politician
- Bogdan Burtea, Romanian scholar
- Bogdan Curta, Romanian folk singer
- Bogdan Diklić, Serbian actor
- Bogdan Filov, Bulgarian archaeologist and politician
- Bogdan Gavrilović, Serbian mathematician
- Baka Prase, born Bogdan Ilić, Serbian YouTuber, rapper, gamer and entertainer
- Bogdan Istru, Moldovan poet
- Leopold Mandić, born Bogdan Mandić, Croat Roman Catholic priest
- Bogdan Maglich, American physicist
- Bogdan Marinescu, Romanian politician
- Bogdan Musiał, Polish-German historian
- Bogdan Niculescu-Duvăz, Romanian politician
- Bogdan Olteanu, Romanian politician
- Bogdan Petriceicu Hasdeu, Romanian historian, philologist and politician
- Bogdan Raczynski, Polish electronic musician
- Bogdan Tirnanić, Serbian journalist and essayists
- Bogdan Zimonjić, Serbian priest and military commander

== Surname ==
The surname Bogdan is one of the most common surnames in the Sisak-Moslavina County of Croatia. Notable people with the surname include:

- Ádám Bogdán (born 1987), Hungarian footballer
- Ana Bogdan (born 1992), Romanian tennis player
- Constantin Bogdan (born 1993), Moldovan footballer
- Christopher Bogdan, United States Air Force general
- Denis Bogdan (born 1996), Russian volleyball player
- George Bogdan (1859–1930), Romanian physician
- Goran Bogdan (born 1980), Croatian actor
- Henry Bogdan (born 1961), American bassist and musician
- Jakub Bogdan (1658–1724), Slovak painter
- Konstantinos Bogdanos, Greek journalist and politician
- Luka Bogdan (born 1996), Croatian footballer
- Małgorzata Bogdan, Polish statistician
- Radu Bogdan (born 1946), American philosopher
- Rareș Bogdan (born 1974), Romanian politician
- Srećko Bogdan (born 1957), Croatian footballer
- Zvonko Bogdan (born 1942), Serbian composer and singer

== See also ==
- Bogdanski
- Bogdani, surname meaning son of Bogdan
- Bogdanos
- Bogdanov, surname meaning son of Bogdan
- Bogdanovich (Bogdanović), surname meaning son of Bogdan
- Bogdan Corporation, a Ukrainian vehicle manufacturer
