= Bogdanovich =

Bogdanovich is a Slavic patronymic surname found across the Slavic speaking world, meaning "son of Bogdan", spelt Богданович transliterated Bogdanovich (Russian) or Bohdanovych (Ukrainian), Bahdanovič, Багдановiч and Bagdanavich, Багданавiч (Belarusian), Bogdanowicz (Polish), and Богдановић transliterated Bogdanović (Serbian). In Lithuanian, there are several equivalents: Bogdanovičius and Bagdanavičius are formal Lithuanizations of the Slavic surnames, and Bagdonavičius, derived from the Lithuanian version of the given name, Bagdonas. Notable people with the surname include:

- Alex Bogdanović (born 1984), British tennis player of Serbian descent
- Angel Bogdanovich (1860–1907) Russian literary critic and social activist
- Bogdan Bogdanović (architect) (1922–2010), Serbian architect and politician
- Bogdan Bogdanović (basketball) (born 1992), Serbian basketball player who currently plays for the Atlanta Hawks
- Bojan Bogdanović (born 1989), Herzegovinian-born Croatian basketballer
- Dimitrije Bogdanović (1930–1986), Serbian historian
- Dušan Bogdanović (born 1955), Serbian-born American composer and classical guitarist
- Daniel Bogdanovic (born 1980), Maltese footballer of Serbian descent
- Goran Bogdanović (born 1967), retired Serbian footballer
- Ippolit Bogdanovich (1743–1803), Russian poet
- Maksim Bahdanovič (1891–1917), Belarusian poet
- Martin J. Bogdanovich (1882–1944), founder of StarKist
- Modest Ivanovitch Bogdanovich (1805–1882), Russian general
- Peter Bogdanovich (1939–2022), American film director, writer, and actor of Serbian descent
- Rade Bogdanović (born 1970), Serbian footballer
- Stanislav Bogdanovich (1993–2020), Ukrainian chess player
- Viktor Bogdanovic (born 1981), Swiss-born American comic book artist

== See also ==
- Bogdani
- Bogdanov
