= Božidar =

- Pronunciation: Serbian pronunciation: [bôʒidaːr]
- Gender: male

Origin
- Origin: Slavic
- Meaning: Divine gift / God's gift

Božidar (Bulgarian, Macedonian, Serbian Cyrillic: Божидар, Polish: Bożydar, sometimes transliterated as Bojidar, or Bozhidar) is a Slavic masculine given name.

It means "divine gift", derived from the Slavic elements božĭjĭ ("divine") and darŭ ("gift"). The name is a calque of the Greek name Theodoros. Direct cognates of the latter and of Božidar in the (South) Slavic languages include: Teodor, Todor, Tudor, Todo. The feminine form of the name is Božidara.

Notable people with the name Božidar include:

- Božidar "Boki" Milošević (1931–2018), Serbian clarinetist
- Božidar "Boško" Antić (1944–2007), Bosnian Serb footballer
- Bozidar Brazda (born 1972), Canadian artist, writer, and musician
- Bozidar Cuk (born 1992), Montenegrin volleyball player
- Bozidar Iskrenov (born 1962), Bulgarian footballer
- Božidar Adžija (1890–1941), Yugoslav left-wing politician and journalist
- Božidar Alić (1954–2020), Croatian actor
- Božidar Antunović (born 1991), Serbian shot putter
- Božidar Bandović (born 1969), Serbian football player and manager
- Božidar Belojević (1928–1997), Yugoslav footballer
- Božidar Beravs (born 1948), Slovenian ice hockey player
- Božidar Bojović (1938–2021), Montenegrin chief physician and politician
- Božidar Ćosić (born 1982), Serbian footballer
- Božidar Ćosović (1916–1943), Yugoslav gendarmerie officer
- Božidar Čačić (born 1972), Croatian footballer
- Božidar Debenjak (born 1935), Slovenian Marxist philosopher, social theorist and translator
- Božidar Delić (1956–2022), Yugoslav Army general, former vice president of Serbia
- Božidar Đelić (born 1965), Serbian economist and politician
- Božidar Đorđević (born 1959), Yugoslav rower
- Božidar Drenovac, (1922–2003), Serbian football player and manager
- Božidar Đurašević (1933–2022), Serbian chess player
- Božidar Đurašković (born 1924), Yugoslav middle distance runner
- Božidar Đurković, (born 1972), Serbian footballer
- Božidar Ferjančić (1929–1998), Serbian historian
- Božidar Finka (1925–1999), Croatian linguist and lexicographer
- Božidar Goraždanin (fl. 16th century), founder of the Goražde printing house
- Božidar Grujović, pseudonym of Teodor Filipović (1778–1807), Serbian writer, jurist and educator
- Božidar Ivanović (born 1946), Montenegrin Yugoslav chess grandmaster and politician
- Božidar Jakac (1899–1989), Slovene painter
- Božidar Janković, (1951–1993), Bosnian footballer
- Božidar Janković (1849–1920), Serbian army general and commander
- Božidar Jelovac (born 1987), Serbian footballer
- Božidar Jović (born 1972), Croatian handball player
- Božidar Kalmeta (born 1958), Croatian politician
- Božidar Kantušer (1921–1999), Slovene composer
- Božidar Karađorđević (1862–1908), Serbian artist and writer on art
- Božidar Kavran (1913–1948), Croatian Ustaše war criminal
- Božidar Kljajević (born 1953) is a Serbian historian, geographer and ethnologist
- Božidar Knežević (born 1862), Serbian philosopher
- Božidar Kolaković (1929–2010), Serbian footballer
- Božidar Kunc (1903–1964), Croatian composer and pianist
- Božidar Leiner (1919–1942), Croatian communist and Partisan
- Božidar Leković (born 1991), Montenegrin handball player
- Božidar Liščić (1929–2020), Croatian engineer
- Božidar Magovac (1908–1955), Croatian journalist and politician
- Božidar Maksimović (1886–1969), Serbian lawyer and politician
- Božidar Maljković (born 1952), Serbian basketball coach
- Božidar Matić (1937–2016), Bosnian politician and academic
- Božidar Milenković (1954–2020), Serbian footballer
- Božidar Milojković (born 1952), Serbian cartoonist and comic book artist
- Božidar Munćan (1925–1990), Serbian basketball player
- Božidar Nikolić (1942–2021), Serbian film director and screenwriter
- Božidar Orešković (1942–2010), Croatian actor
- Božidar Pavićević (1932–2004), Serbian actor
- Božidar Pešić (born 1952), Serbian basketball player
- Božidar Peter (1938–2012), former Croatian handball player
- Božidar Petranović (1809–1874), Serbian author, scholar, journalist, historian of Serbian literature
- Božidar Prokić (1859–1922), Serbian historian
- Božidar Puretić (1921–1971), Croatian physician
- Božidar Purić (1891–1977), Serbian and Yugoslav politician and diplomat
- Božidar Radošević (born 1989), Croatian footballer
- Božidar Rašica (1912–1992), Yugoslav architect, scenographer and painter
- Božidar Sandić (1922–2008), Serbian footballer
- Božidar Senčar (1927–1987), Croatian footballer
- Božidar Širola (1889–1956), Croatian composer and musicologist
- Božidar Smiljanić (1936–2018), Croatian actor
- Božidar Špišić (1879–1957), Croatian orthopedist and rector of the University of Zagreb
- Božidar Stanišić (1936–2014), Montenegrin water polo player
- Božidar Tadić (born 1983), Serbian footballer
- Božidar Urošević (born 1975), Serbian footballer
- Božidar Vidoeski (1920–1998), Macedonian linguist
- Božidar Vučićević (born 1998), Serbian volleyball player
- Božidar Vuković (1466–1540), one of the first printers of Serbian books
- Božidar Zečević (born 1948), Serbian film historian

== See also ==
- Bożydar (disambiguation)
- Bozhidar
- Slavic names
