= Khodadadi =

Khodadadi (Persian: خدادادي) may refer to:

- Khodadadi, Fars
- Khodadadi, Hormozgan

== See also ==
- Khodadad (disambiguation)
