= Bagdonavičius =

- Lithuanian surname
- m.: Bagdonavičius
- f.: (married): Bagdonavičienė
- Related names: Bogdanowicz, Bogdanovich, Bagdanavičius, Bogdanovičius

Bagdonavičius is a Lithuanian surname. Notable people with the surname include:

- Antanas Bagdonavičius (1938–2024), Lithuanian rower
- Gerardas Bagdonavičius (1901–1986), Lithuanian graphic artist, pedagogue
- Vaclovas Bagdonavičius (1941–2020), Lithuanian philosopher, literary critic, researcher of the culture of Lithuania Minor
- Vilijandas Bagdonavičius (born 1949), Lithuanian mathematician
