= Leiner =

Leiner is a surname. Notable people with the surname include:

- Benjamin Leiner, American boxer
- Božidar Leiner (1919–1942), Croatian Jewish resistance fighter
- Danny Leiner, American film director
- Gershon Henoch Leiner, Polish Jewish theologian
- Laura Leiner, Hungarian writer
- Mordechai Yosef Leiner, Polish Jewish theologian
- Shmuel Shlomo Leiner, Polish Jewish theologian
- Simcha Leiner, American Orthodox Jewish singer

== See also ==
- Leiner Health Products, American pharmaceutical company
