= Stefan Ramniceanu =

Romanian painter and visual artist

- Born: Ștefan Râmniceanu; 15 August 1954; Ploiești, Romanian People's Republic
- Known for: Painting, Visual Arts
- Website: www.ramniceanu.com

Stefan Ramniceanu (born Ștefan Râmniceanu, 15 August 1954) is a Romanian painter and visual artist. According to the philosopher and critic Andrei Pleșu, Ramniceanu is "one of those artists who know how to seduce, surprise and irritate; in other words, he has the gift to be unpredictable."

== From Communist Romania to the "Free World" ==
Ștefan Râmniceanu was born in Ploiești in 1954. He graduated in 1979 from the Nicolae Grigorescu Faculty of Fine Arts at the University of Bucharest. In 1985 when he began showing his art work in two galleries of Bucharest: Atelier 35 and Galeria Orizont. Art critic and historian Radu Bogdan and writer and philosopher Nicolae Steinhardt both praised his work for re-envisioning light in painting, making it a "light from the inside", i.e., a light coming from the artistic shape itself that makes it lighter and raises it to a higher spirituality. The excitement that accompanied the artist's revelation to the public was reflected in a landmark essay entitled "Stefan Ramniceanu, artistic path", in which art critic and historian Răzvan Theodorescu expressed how Ramniceanu's oeuvre had been a revelation to him, inspiring him "the feeling of a new future for contemporary art" in Romania.

A couple of years later, in 1988, as his work was beginning to be exhibited abroad – notably in Bulgaria, Hungary, and Austria, where he represented Romania at the Expoziția de Artă Plastică Româneasca – Ramniceanu held his solo exhibition "Ferecătura" in the Curtea Veche palace, the most ancient palace in Bucharest and a voivodal residence from the 14th century. Theodorescu, who was to become Minister of Culture and Religious Affairs some years later, served as a curator for that exhibition which was to become a landmark event in the capital's cultural life. Designed as a tribute to celebrate three centuries from the coming to power of Romania's leading historical figure Constantin Brâncoveanu as Prince of Wallachia, the exhibition re-envisioned the imagery of Orthodox church through contemporary, abstracted "icons", turning art as a form of coded dissent against the oppression of the Ceausescu regime of that time. Ferecătura attracted Ramniceanu much attention, and the Romanian television devoted to him a 45-minute reportage entitled "The sense of grandeur, the cult of the effort and the joy of the offensive in Stefan Ramniceanu's art work" named after the striking expression used by Andrei Pleșu (Romanian Minister of Culture from 1989 to 1991 and Minister of Foreign Affairs from 1997 to 1999) in his essay entitled "The Crusade of Stefan Ramniceanu".

== The confrontation with the international art trials ==
Following this exhibition, Ramniceanu's art work gained the interest of the "free world" diplomatic circles, which opened him doors to exhibitions outside the communist world. This is how his solo exhibition Ferecătura was itinerated in Athens on the initiative of the Greek Ministry of Culture in Greece one year later, in 1989. The exhibition, held at the Rizarios Theological Institute under the name "Report to Byzantium", made Ramniceanu one of the very few Romanian artists to access the Western world during Nicolae Ceaușescu's Romania. This initiative received widespread coverage from the Greek media and the City of Athens received as a tribute Ramniceanu's "Byzantine Bell" - one of the most emblematic sculptures of the exhibition - that is now exhibited on Vassilissis Sofias Avenue as part of the city public art collection.

Shortly after having taken part in the Romanian Revolution in December 1989, Ramniceanu was invited by the French government and eventually established his studio in Paris in 1991. First a fellow of the French government, he became a resident of the Cité internationale des arts in 1992 and was awarded the French citizenship some years later. "I paint neither with tubes of paint nor with paintbrushes, I paint with the memory of things" Ramniceanu declared recently about his work, which has been exhibited widely in Paris and extensively abroad since the early 1990s in galleries such as Bernanos, Sandoz-Cité Internationale des Arts, Louis, FH Art Forum' and Visio Dell'Arte in Paris, Jardin de Lumière in Belgium, HS Kunst in Germany, Uni-Terre in Geneva, and in numerous contemporary art fairs in Paris, in Istanbul, and in Dubai.

Over the years, Ramniceanu has distinguished himself as one of the emblematic artists of the Romanian diaspora in Paris, as reflected by his being portrayed in several Romanian TV shows. In 1994, the vernissage of its major exhibition "The Shirts of the Wall" held at the Romanian Cultural Institute of Paris is broadcast by the Romanian television. The following year, he interviewed with Mihaela Cristea as part of her TV report on Romanian success stories in France and sit down with Monica Zvirjinski in her "top personalities" show. Some years later, in 2004, he interviewed with Vlad Nistor on Realitatea TV. One year after, the Romanian television dedicated to Ramniceanu a special one-hour live biographical show where the artist discussed his art, work process, as well as his transition to the Paris art arena.

== The search of the "Universal Man" ==
Dan Hăulică described Ramniceanu's creative ambition in his critical essay entitled "Byzantium after Pollock" inspired to him by Ramniceanu's 2001 solo exhibition "Gaze at the Golden Nights" held in the Paris premises of F.H. Art Forum Gallery: "A Byzantium which has gone through the radical exclamation of blacks by Soulages or Kline, and by Pollock's vibratory expansion." Ramniceanu's art cannot be simply categorized in any particular style, nor does it subscribe to a single artistic tradition. However, Ramniceanu derives inspiration from a variety of sources, including the detail and refinement of Romanian embroideries, and the imagery of Orthodox artworks. The language of material plays an essential role in the work of Stefan Ramniceanu, most of whose pictures have a three-dimensional structure. For the past forty years, his work has been developing in a process of accumulation, mingling and reworking of themes, motifs and symbols which recur and overlap repeatedly in diverse media. Highly symbolic connections emerge from metal, concrete, wire and other heterogeneous materials. Numerous pastose layers of muted colors lend the surface of his paintings a relief-like structure and thus an almost sculptural plasticity. The artist has borrowed indeed vocabulary from the specifics of painting crossing the disciplines of photography, sculpture, where he now focuses his efforts. When provocation has been erected as a system in contemporary art, Ramniceanu's artistic position is to constantly question and expand the classical notion of sensibility. The artist defines this search as an accompaniment towards the figure of the "universal human", a new abstracted understanding of the figure.

In 2014 a large-scale retrospective of his oeuvre is to be held at the Cultural Center of the Mogoșoaia Palace in Bucharest.
