= Deodat =

- Gender: Male

Origin
- Origin: Latin
- Meaning: "given by God"

Other names
- Related names: Adeodatus, Dieudonné

Deodat or Déodat is a masculine given name. Deriving from Latin deo datus (IPA: [ˈdɛoː ˈdatʊs]), it means "given by God", in similar usage to Dieudonné, Matthew, Theodore, Jonathan, and Nathaniel.

The name is also found among South Asian communities and their diaspora.

== Notable people ==
- Déodat Gratet de Dolomieu, (1750– 1801), French geologist
- Deodat Lawson, (fl. 1684–1688), British colonial minister
- Deodat del Monte, (1582–1644), Flemish painter, architect, engineer, astronomer, and art dealer
- Déodat de Séverac, (1872–1921), French composer
- Deodatus of Nevers (d. 679), bishop of Nevers

== See also ==
- Deodato (disambiguation), a similar name
