= Deusdedit =

Deusdedit or Deodatus (literally "God has given" and "Given by God" respectively) is the name of several ecclesiastical figures of the Middle Ages:

- Pope Deusdedit or Pope Adeodatus I (died 618)
- Deusdedit of Canterbury (died 664)
- Deodatus of Nevers or Deodatus of Jointures (died c. 679)
- Deusdedit of San Pietro in Vincoli (fl. 11th century), cardinal and canon lawyer
- Deusdedit of San Lorenzo in Damaso (fl. 12th century), cardinal and papal legate
- Teodato Ipato or Deusdedit, Doge of Venice 742–751
- Deodatus of Nola, a saint in the 5th century
- Deodatus of Blois, a saint in the 6th century
- Thiddag (Deodatus) (998–1017), a bishop of Prague

== Modern era ==
- Deusdedit Muhumuza (born 1989), Ugandan cricketer

== See also ==
- Adeodatus (disambiguation)
- Deodat
- Theodore (disambiguation)
- Dorotheus (disambiguation)
- Dieudonné (disambiguation)
