= Bagdonas =

- Lithuanian surname
- m.: Bagdonas
- f.: (unmarried): Bagdonaitė
- f.: (married): Bagdonienė
- f.: (short): Bagdonė

Bagdonas is a Lithuanian family name. The word is the Lithuanized form of the Slavic name Bogdan, meaning 'God Given'. Notable people with the surname include:

- Brian Bagdonas, American musician, bassist of Foghorn Stringband
- Ed Bagdonas (1937-1985), American athlete
- Edminas Bagdonas (1963-2021), Lithuanian politician and diplomat
- Gediminas Bagdonas (born 1985), Lithuanian road racing cyclist
- Juozas Bagdonas (painter) (1911–2005), Lithuanian painter
- Juozas Bagdonas (rower) (born 1968), Lithuanian Olympic rower
- Rimantas Bagdonas (born 1938), Lithuanian wrestler
