= Bogdanski =

Bogdański is a Polish surname. It comes from the given name Bogdan. Notable people with the surname include:

- Ed Bogdanski (1921–1989), American basketball player
- Jack Bogdanski (fl. 1970s–2010s), American professor of law at Lewis & Clark Law School in Portland, Oregon
- Jezdimir Bogdanski (1930–2007), Macedonian politician and participant in the National Liberation War
- Joseph Bogdanski (1911–1997), Chief Justice of the Connecticut Supreme Court
- Renata Bogdańska (1920–2010), stage name of Irena Anders, Polish actress and singer
- Sammi Bogdanski, original keyboardist for the band Black Lungs
