= Kljajević =

Kljajević (Serbian Cyrillic: Kљajeвић) is a Serbian surname. Notable people with the surname include:

- Božidar Kljajević, Serbian historian
- Srđan Kljajević (born 1974), Serbian footballer
- Željko Kljajević, Serbian footballer
