= Curta (disambiguation) =

Curta is a hand-held mechanical calculator designed by Curt Herzstark.

Curta may also refer to:

- Bogdan Curta (born 1982), Romanian folk singer-songwriter, poet and radio host
- Florin Curta (born 1965), Romanian-born American archaeologist and historian
- Curta (footballer), or Josep Puig Puig (1922 – 1997), Spanish football player
