= Charlie the Tuna =

Mascot and spokes-tuna of StarKist

- First appearance: 1961
- Created by: Tom Rogers
- Voiced by: Herschel Bernardi; Tex Brashear; Ron Hawking; Jeff Bergman

In-universe information
- Species: Tuna
- Gender: Male
- Occupation: Mascot of StarKist

Charlie the Tuna is the cartoon mascot and spokes-tuna for the StarKist brand. He was created in 1961 by Tom Rogers of the Leo Burnett Agency. StarKist Tuna is owned by Dongwon Industries, a South Korea–based conglomerate. Charlie is one of the most recognized characters in American advertising.

== History ==
=== Creation ===
Charlie the Tuna was based on Tom Rogers' friend Henry Nemo. Nemo is known as the "creator of jive", which resembles the loose-lipped slang used by Charlie the Tuna.

=== Campaign ===
The advertisements depicted Charlie (voiced by actor Herschel Bernardi) as a hipster, originally a lower class New York accented beatnik wearing a beret and thick glasses who believes that his hip, cultured "good taste" make him a perfect catch for StarKist, but he is always rejected. Announcer Danny Dark explains to him "Sorry, Charlie!" Some advertisements ended with Charlie encouraging viewers to "Tell 'em, Charlie sent you". Earlier advertisements would have some other form of sea life saying "But Charlie, StarKist does not want tunas with good taste; they want tunas that taste good." These commercials were animated by DePatie–Freleng Enterprises. "Sorry, Charlie" became a popular American catchphrase.

The Charlie character appeared in more than 85 advertisements for StarKist until the 1980s, when the campaign was retired. Herschel Bernardi, the original voice of the character, died on May 9, 1986. Charlie made a comeback in 1999, when StarKist revived him to introduce a new line of tuna products marketed as healthy. He has been the mascot of the company since then and is one of the most-recognized brand mascots in American advertising.

Dark died on June 13, 2004, while Rogers died on June 24, 2005.

== Legacy ==
Los Angeles radio personality and voiceover artist Charlie Tuna (real name: Art Ferguson) chose his on-air name early in his career upon the departure of another Oklahoma City disc jockey. All disc jockeys at KOMA were told to draw their on-air names out of a hat, and by the time Chuck Riley picked his on-air name out of a hat, every name had been drawn except for "Charlie Tuna". Riley used the name for a week, and then left. His replacement, Art Ferguson, inherited the name, and he would keep the Charlie Tuna name upon relocating first to Boston and then Los Angeles.

American football head coach Bill Parcells earned the nickname "The Big Tuna" when he responded to an obviously false statement from a player with the incredulous "Who do you think I am? Charlie the Tuna?"

American hip-hop star Chali 2na chose his rap name by slightly modifying the name Charlie Tuna, a nickname his uncle gave him in his youth.

During the production of the 2017 film The Shape of Water, director Guillermo del Toro remarked of the creature in the film: "[The] character is called 'Charlie' on the call-sheet by reference to the StarKist mascot Charlie the Tuna. 'We wanted to play the ad on TV', he says, 'but StarKist didn't want to have anything to do with a movie like this. The nickname stayed'".

Charlie the Tuna makes a cameo appearance in the 2012 animated film Foodfight! and is also featured on the North American home video cover art of it.

Charlie the Tuna was shown in MasterCard's 2005 "Icons" commercial which was shown during Super Bowl XXXIX, and depicts many famous advertising mascots having dinner together.
