= Juozas Bagdonas =

Juozas Bagdonas can refer to:

- Juozas Bagdonas (painter) (1911–2005), Lithuanian painter
- Juozas Bagdonas (rower) (born 1968), Lithuanian Olympic rower
