= Tunagate =

1985 Canadian political scandal

Tunagate was a 1985 Canadian political scandal involving large quantities of tuna that had been declared unfit for human consumption that were sold to the public under order of the Minister of Fisheries and Oceans, John Fraser.

The story broke on September 17 in the CBC program The Fifth Estate. Fisheries inspectors had found that StarKist Tuna, processed by a New Brunswick plant, had spoiled, and declared that it was "unfit for human consumption."

A St. Andrews, New Brunswick plant had processed the tuna, and the forced destruction of a million cans of tuna would likely cause the plant to close down. The owners of the plant thus lobbied fisheries minister Fraser. He decided the tuna should be allowed on store shelves. He later defended himself saying he felt the business owners were right that the inspectors were too severe, or that the inspectors could have made a mistake. He also stated that he had two other independent groups test the tuna, but the laboratory that did these tests later revealed that their testing was not complete when Fraser made his decision.

The day after the story broke, both opposition parties attacked Fraser, and on Thursday, a recall of the tuna was announced. The following Monday Fraser resigned, mostly settling the affair. Rules were changed to make it impossible for ministers to overrule the decision of food inspectors.

The main unanswered question was how much Prime Minister Brian Mulroney knew at the time. Fraser at first stated that he had informed the Prime Minister's Office. Mulroney originally said so as well. Almost immediately afterwards both recanted and stated that Mulroney had not been informed until the story had broken. Mulroney was also accused of being less than truthful when he told The New York Times he had fired Fraser as soon as he had heard of the affair, when in fact it had taken six days.

Despite intense national coverage for many weeks, in the end, the story ended up being mostly forgotten. Today there remains no evidence of any people getting sick from the tuna that was sold. Fraser's career recovered and eventually he became Speaker of the House of Commons. The reputations of both StarKist Canada and the Mulroney government were hurt, however. StarKist, which had enjoyed a thirty-nine percent market share, saw it collapse to near zero, and in 1991, it pulled out of Canada. The four hundred employees of the New Brunswick plant were put out of work as one of the largest employers in Charlotte County shut down.
