= Bogdanos =

Bogdanos is a surname. Notable people with the surname include:

- Dimitris Bogdanos (born 1975), Greek basketball player
- Konstantinos Bogdanos (born 1979), Greek politician and journalist
- Matthew Bogdanos, American lawyer, author, boxer, and Marine colonel

== See also ==
- Bogdan, a Slavic masculine name
