= Bożydar =

Bożydar refers to the following places in Poland:

- Bożydar, Greater Poland Voivodeship
- Bożydar, Świętokrzyskie Voivodeship
- Bożydar-Kałęczyn, a former town, now incorporated into Warsaw, Masovian Voivodeship

== See also ==
- Bożydar is a pseudonym of Edmund Bogdanowicz
- Božidar
