= FK Njegoš Lovćenac =

FK Njegoš
- Full name: Fudbalski klub Njegoš
- Nicknames: Crnogorci (The Montenegrins); Crna Munja (Black Lightning)
- Founded: 4 October 1946; 79 years ago as Fudbalski klub Sloga
- Ground: Stadion FK Njegoš, Lovćenac
- Capacity: 582
- President: Boris Stevović
- League: PFL Subotica
- 2024–25: PFL Subotica, 2nd
Home colours	Away colours

Fudbalski klub Njegoš (Serbian Cyrillic: Фудбалски клуб Његош) is a Serbian football club based in the village of Lovćenac, in the Bačka region, Vojvodina. They currently compete in the fifth-tier PFL Subotica league. The club was founded by Montenegrin settlers in 1946, and named in honor of Prince-Bishop Petar II Petrović-Njegoš.

== History ==
The football club was originally founded as Fudbalski klub Sloga (English: Football Club Unity), by Montenegrin settlers to the village of Lovćenac (previously named Sekić) following World War II. The club playing its first game against a squad representing the neighbouring village of Feketić on May Day, 1946 and was officially registered on October 4, 1946. The club changed its name to Fudbalski klub Lovćen (English: Football Club Lovćen) in 1949 and finally to Fudbalski klub Njegoš (English: Football Club Njegoš) following an administrative takeover by local agricultural cooperative "Njegoš" in 1957.

The team competed in the Bačka Topola and Subotica district leagues until achieving promotion to the Vojvodina League for season 1974/75 after a two-leg win over Mladost Apatin. Promotion was short lived though as Njegoš were relegated in their debut season. The club would enter the Vojvodina League on two other occasions for season 1990-91 and 2006–07, only to be relegated on both occasions.

In October 2016 Njegoš hosted Red Star Belgrade in a friendly match to mark the 70th anniversary of the club's founding with the game ending in a 4–0 win for the guests. Njegoš were promoted to the fourth tier Vojvodina League North after topping the PFL Subotica table in season 2019–20.

=== Recent league history ===
Season	Division	P	W	D	L	F	A	Pts	Pos
2020–21	4 - Vojvodina League North	34	13	7	14	49	55	46	12th
2021–22	4 - Vojvodina League North	30	3	4	23	32	95	13	16th
2022–23	5 - PFL Subotica	28	10	3	15	63	63	33	10th
2023–24	5 - PFL Subotica	30	11	3	16	48	85	36	12th
2024–25	5 - PFL Subotica	30	21	5	4	77	25	68	2nd

== Crest and colours ==
The club initially wore a red star (petokraka) on an all white kit during the early Socialist era. Use of the star dissipated over time though the club retained its white kit, with alternating shorts colour's. The team also wore a kit based on the traditional tricolour flags of both SR Serbia and SR Montenegro at the time. During the 90s Njegoš began adopting a primarily all red outfit and a mainly white away kit which it still retains. Since the late 2000s the team image has been inspired by the Montenegro national football team.

The crest of Njegoš is a bronze edged shield. The upper portion features the club name ФК ЊЕГОШ (English; FK NJEGOŠ) in bronze Serbian Cyrillic on a white background. The interior of the emblem is crimson in which there is a stylised depiction of the Mausoleum of Njegoš on Mount Lovćen in bronze, whilst ЛОВЋЕНАЦ (English; LOVĆENAC) is written in bronze letters above the mausoleum.

== Stadium ==
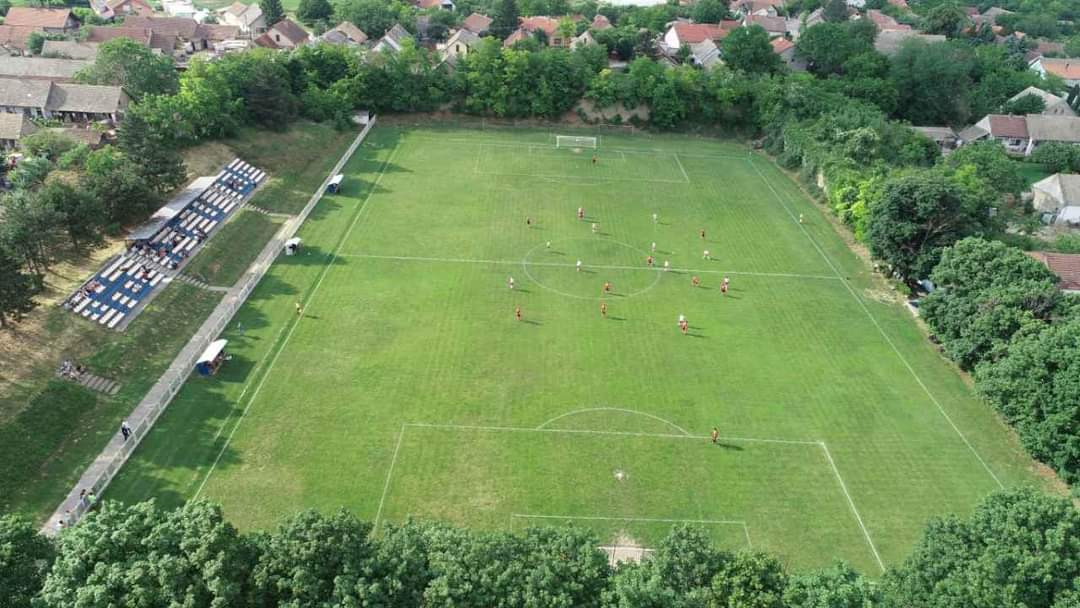
Stadion "FK Njegoš" in Lovćenac

Stadion "FK Njegoš" is the club's home ground. It is located in north-western Lovćenac on the corner of Blažo Orlandić and Đuro Đaković St. The humble facility features a 582 capacity western terrace, club rooms, and unique cliff side topography.

== Supporters and rivalries ==
Njegoš derives support from the village of Lovćenac, and the broader Montenegrin community in the Bačka region. Traditional rivals include teams from surrounding villages such as FK Egység (Mali Iđoš) and FK Jadran (Feketić). Other club rivalries include FK Vrbas, FK Crvenka, FK Srbobran and FK TSC. Since 2018 Njegoš, alongside neighbouring club FK Jadran have been in official partnership with Serbian SuperLiga club FK Spartak Subotica.

== Honours ==
- PFL Subotica (1): 2019-20

== Notable players ==
- (Socialist Federal Republic of Yugoslavia) Božidar Belojević
- (Serbia) Andrija Kaluđerović
- (Serbia and Montenegro) Radovan Krivokapić
- (Montenegro) Savo Pavićević
- (Socialist Federal Republic of Yugoslavia) Danilo Popivoda
- (Socialist Federal Republic of Yugoslavia) Zvezdan Terzić

== Coaches ==
- (Serbia) Momčilo Raičević (2019–2021)
