= Savo Pavićević =

Serbian-born Montenegrin footballer

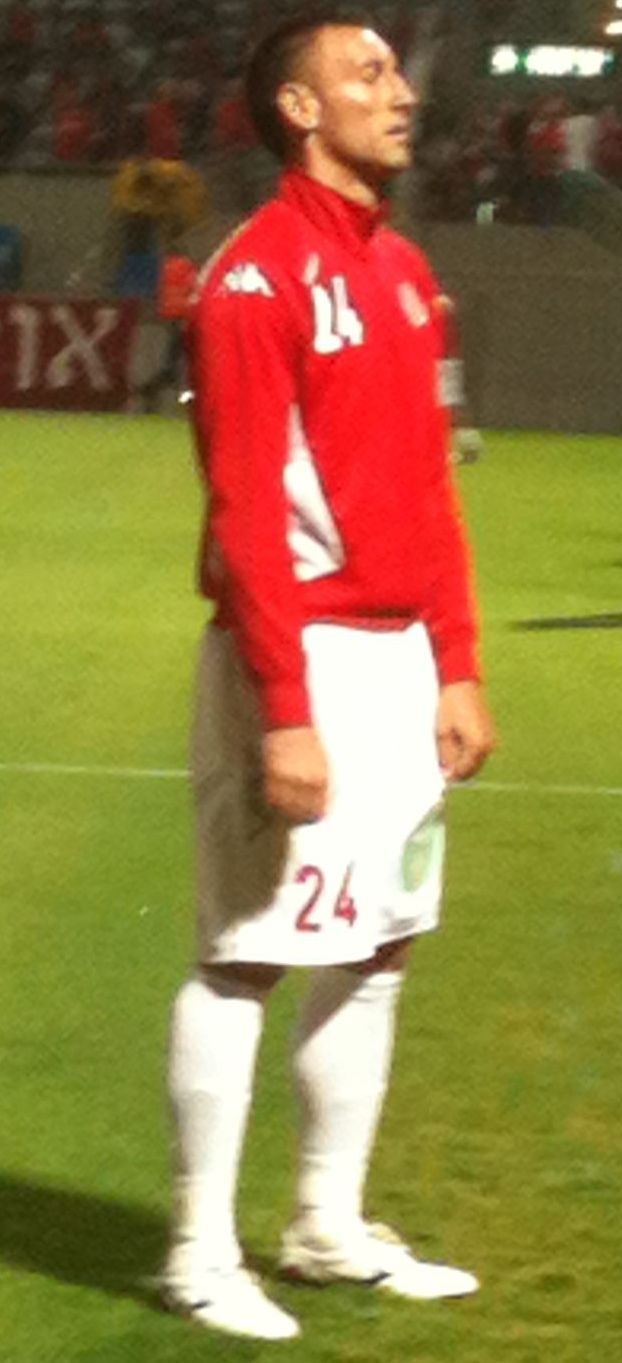

Personal information
- Full name: Savo Pavićević
- Date of birth: 11 December 1980 (age 45)
- Place of birth: Kikinda, SFR Yugoslavia
- Height: 1.86 m (6 ft 1 in)
- Position: Defender

Team information
- Current team: Spartak Subotica (Manager)

Senior career*
Years	Team	Apps	(Gls)
1996–1999	Njegoš Lovćenac	39	(1)
1999–2007	Hajduk Kula	140	(2)
2000–2001	→ AIK Bačka Topola (loan)	25	(0)
2001–2002	→ Tekstilac Odžaci (loan)	10	(0)
2002–2003	→ Njegoš Lovćenac (loan)	12	(1)
2008	Vojvodina	11	(0)
2008–2009	Energie Cottbus	24	(0)
2009–2010	Kavala	25	(0)
2010–2012	Maccabi Tel Aviv	50	(1)
2012	Omonia	6	(0)
2012–2013	Hapoel Tel Aviv	12	(0)
2013–2014	Anorthosis	15	(0)
2014–2016	Red Star Belgrade	59	(2)
2016–2017	Spartak Subotica	12	(0)
Total		440	(7)

International career
2007–2014	Montenegro	39	(0)

Managerial career
- 2018–2020: Bačka 1901
- 2022: Radnički 1912
- 2024: Kabel
- 2026–: Spartak Subotica
- * Club domestic league appearances and goals

Savo Pavićević (Cyrillic: Саво Павићевић, pronounced [sǎːʋo paʋǐːtɕeʋitɕ]; born 11 December 1980) is a Serbian-born Montenegrin retired football defender.. He is currently the team's coach Spartak Subotica.

== Club career ==
Pavićević, after playing for almost a decade for Hajduk Kula, played for Vojvodina and for the German Bundesliga club FC Energie Cottbus. On 19 August 2009 he signed for Kavala. On 16 August 2010, Pavićević agreed with Maccabi Tel Aviv signing on a one-year deal following the injury of Nivaldo. In June 2011, Pavićević signed a one-year extension on his original contract with Maccabi. On 3 June 2012, he came to an agreement with AC Omonia and later he played a half season in 2012-2013 for the Israeli club Hapoel Tel Aviv. In the second half of January 2014, Savo signed for Serbian club Red Star Belgrade.

== International career ==
He was the founding member of the National team of Montenegro and made his debut in his country's first ever competitive match on 24 March 2007, a friendly against Hungary in Podgorica. He has earned a total of 39 caps, scoring no goals. His final international was an October 2014 European Championship qualification match against Liechtenstein.

== Managerial statistics ==
As of match played 30 Septembar 2026

Managerial record by team and tenure
Team	From	To	Record				
Team	From	To	P	W	D	L	Win %
Bačka 1901	2 October 2018	27 September 2020	79	33	22	24	41.77
Radnički 1912	24 July 2021	24 August 2022	4	1	1	2	25.00
Kabel	14 March 2024	14 Oktober 2024	12	4	3	5	33.33
Spartak Subotica	10 March 2026	30 Septembar 2026	22	5	3	14	22.73
Total			118	43	29	46	36.44

== Honours ==
Omonia

- Cypriot Super Cup: 2012

Red Star Belgrade

- Serbian SuperLiga: 2013–14, 2015–16
