= Bogdani =

Surname list

Origin
- Meaning: God-given in Albanian

Other names
- Variant forms: Bogdan, Bogdanović

Bogdani is an Albanian surname meaning 'son of Bogdan'. It is of Slavic origin, probably Serbian language, as Bogdan in Slavic means "God-given".

Notable people with the surname include:

- Andrea Bogdani (1600–1683), Ottoman scholar of Albanian origin and Roman Catholic prelate
- Erjon Bogdani (born 1977), Albanian footballer
- Gerti Bogdani (1980–2024), Albanian politician
- Jakob Bogdani (1658–1724), Hungarian painter
- Llukë Bogdani (d. 1687), Ottoman poet of Albanian origin
- Pjetër Bogdani (1627–1689), Albanian writer

== See also ==
- Bogdan, Bohdan
- Bogdanov
- Bogdany (disambiguation)
