= Carl Flügge =

German bacteriologist and hygienist

Carl Georg Friedrich Wilhelm Flügge
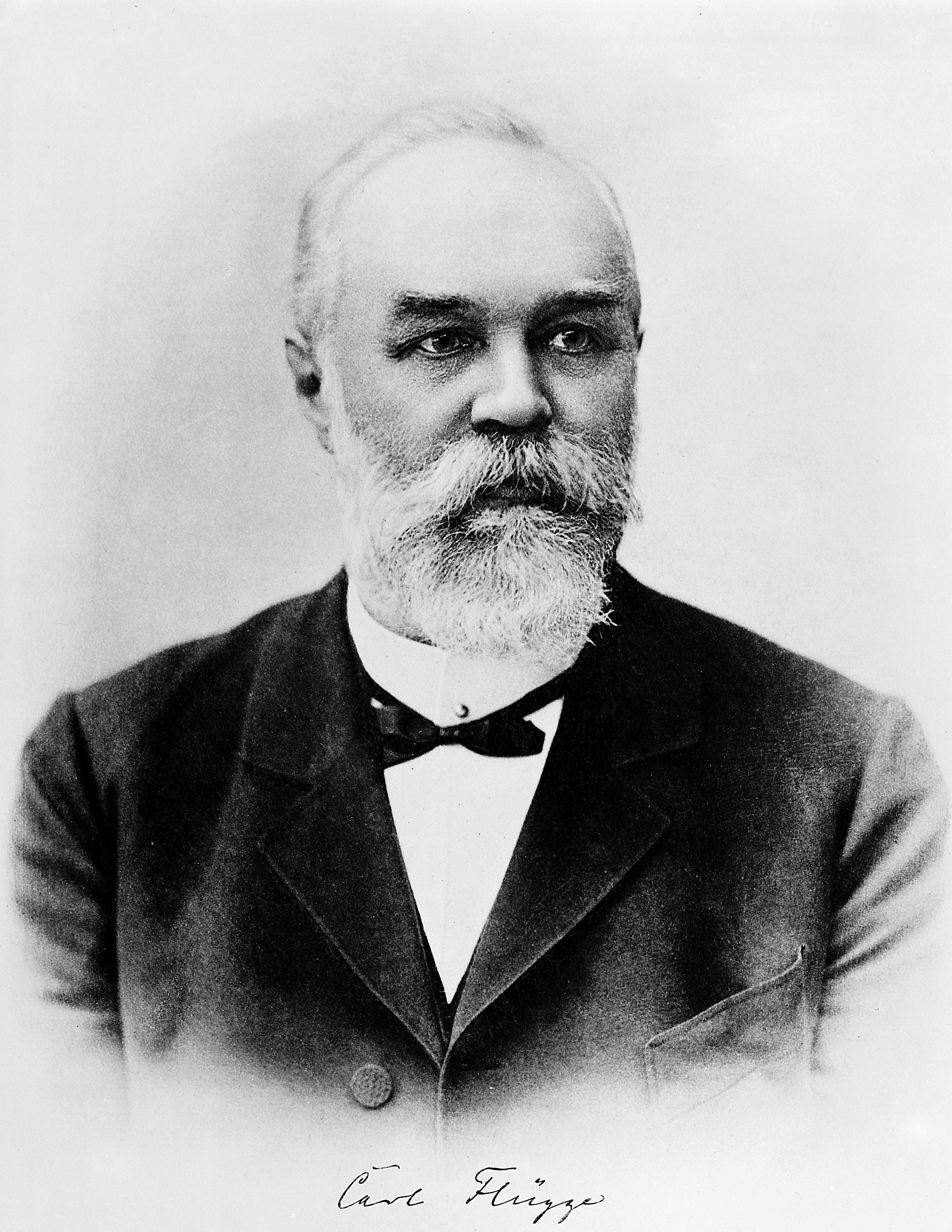
- Born: 12 September 1847; Hanover
- Died: 10 December 1923 (aged 76)
- Education: University of Göttingen; University of Bonn; Leipzig University; Ludwig-Maximilians-Universität München
- Known for: Discovery of Flügge droplets
- Scientific career
- Fields: Bacteriology, Hygiene

Carl Georg Friedrich Wilhelm Flügge (12 September 1847 – 10 December 1923) was a German bacteriologist and hygienist. His finding that pathogens were present in expiratory droplets, the eponymous Flügge droplets, laid the foundations for the concept of droplet transmission as a route for the spread of respiratory infectious diseases.

== Biography ==
Originally from Hanover, Carl Georg Friedrich Wilhelm Flügge studied medicine at the University of Göttingen, the University of Bonn, Leipzig University, and the Ludwig-Maximilians-Universität München. In 1878, he taught hygiene at the Friedrich Wilhelm University of Berlin. In 1881, Flügge became the first chair of hygiene at the University of Göttingen, and afterwards was a professor at the University of Breslau and the Friedrich Wilhelm University of Berlin, where he succeeded Max Rubner (1854–1932) at the Department of Hygiene.

Flügge was a colleague of microbiologist Robert Koch (1843–1910), with whom he co-edited the journal Zeitschrift für Hygiene und Infektionskrankheiten. Two of his better-known assistants at Breslau were Wolfgang Weichardt (1875–1943) and Walther Kruse (1864–1943).

== Research ==
Flügge is known for advocating hygiene as an independent medical discipline, and is remembered for performing extensive research involving the transmission of infectious diseases such as malaria, tuberculosis and cholera. In the 1890s, he demonstrated that even during "quiet speech", minute droplets – the Flügge droplets – are propelled into the air. The finding was instrumental in Jan Mikulicz-Radecki (1850–1905) advocating the use of surgical gauze masks in 1897, and was the foundation for the modern concept of droplet transmission.

== Publications ==
Among his publications are two important books on hygiene:

- Flügge, Carl (1881). Lehrbuch der hygienischen Untersuchungsmethoden [Textbook of hygienic investigation methods] (in German). Leipzig: Verlag von Viet & Comp.
- Flügge, Carl (1889). Grundriss der Hygiene [Outline of hygiene] (in German). Leipzig: Verlag von Viet & Comp.

Other works include:

- Flügge, Carl (1879). Beiträge zur Hygiene [Contributions to Hygiene] (in German). Leipzig: Verlag von Veit & Comp.
- Flügge, Carl (1896). Die mikroorganismen : Mit besonderer berücksichtigung der ätiologie der infektionskrankheiten. Dritte, völlig umgearbeitete Auflage [Microorganisms : With special reference to the etiology of infectious diseases. Third edition, completely edited] (in German). Leipzig: Vogel. Part 1; Part 2.

Articles include:

- Die Verbreitung der Phthise durch staubförmiges Sputum und durch beim Husten verspritzte Tröpfchen. Zeitschrift für Hygiene und Infektionskrankheiten volume 30, pages 107–124 (1899)

== Bibliography ==
- Lehrbuch der hygienischen Untersuchungsmethoden
- The Gospel of Germs: Men, Women, and the Microbe in American Life
- Charles M. Poser, G. W. Bruyn (1999). An illustrated history of malaria. Informa Health Care. p. 39. ISBN 1-85070-068-0.
- Rines, George Edwin, ed. (1920). "Flügge, Karl" . Encyclopedia Americana.
