= Bozhidar =

Bozhidar may refer to:

- Bozhidar (poet) (1894–1914), Russian futurist poet of Ukrainian origin
- Bozhidar Andreev (born 1997), Bulgarian weightlifter
- Bozhidar Bozhanov (born 1987), Bulgarian programmer and politician
- Bozhidar Dimitrov (1945–2018), Bulgarian historian and politician
- Bozhidar Grigorov (born 1945), Bulgarian footballer
- Bozhidar Iskrenov (born 1962), Bulgarian footballer
- Bozhidar Ivanov (boxer) (born 1956), a Bulgarian Olympic boxer
- Bozhidar Ivanov (gymnast) (born 1943), a Bulgarian Olympic gymnast
- Bozhidar Lukarski (born 1972), Bulgarian politician
- Bozhidar Milenkov (born 1954), Bulgarian canoer
- Bozhidar Sarâboyukov (born 2004), Bulgarian athlete

== See also ==
- Božidar
