= Walther Kruse =

German bacteriologist

Walther Kruse (September 8, 1864 – 1943) was a German bacteriologist who was a native of Berlin.

In 1888 he received his doctorate from Berlin, where he was a student of Rudolf Virchow (1821–1902). From 1889 until 1892 he worked as a bacteriologist in Naples, and in 1892 travelled to Egypt to perform research on dysentery. In 1893 he became an assistant to hygienist Carl Flügge (1847–1923) in Breslau, and in 1898 became an associate professor at the University of Bonn. Later he served as a full professor in Königsberg (1900), Bonn (1911) and Leipzig (1913).

Walther Kruse is remembered for his work in parasitology and his research of intestinal bacteria infections. He performed extensive studies of Shigella dysenteriae during an epidemic of dysentery in the Ruhr area of Germany. This organism is sometimes referred to as the "Shiga–Kruse bacillus", and its associated disease as "Shiga–Kruse dysentery". These eponyms are shared with Japanese bacteriologist Kiyoshi Shiga (1871–1957). Kruse documented his findings in a 1900 treatise titled Über die Ruhr als Volkskrankheit und ihren Erreger.

In 1914 he demonstrated that the common cold could be transmitted to healthy individuals via nasal secretions that were free of bacteria. The results of these experiments were published in a treatise called Die Erreger von Husten und Schnupfen (1914). A specialized tool used to spread material over the surface of a culture medium is called "Kruse's brush".
