= Wolfgang Weichardt =

German bacteriologist

Julius Wolfgang Weichardt (13 May 1875 – 1943) was a German bacteriologist who was a native of Altenburg, Thüringen.

In 1900 he received his doctorate at Breslau, where he became an assistant to Carl Flügge (1847-1923) at the laboratory for hygiene and bacteriology. Afterwards he was an assistant in Dresden under pathologist Christian Georg Schmorl (1861-1932), in Paris at the Pasteur Institute under Ilya Ilyich Mechnikov (1845-1916), in Hamburg under American-born hygienist William Philipps Dunbar (1863-1922), and at the Berlin institute of hygiene under Max Rubner (1854-1932).

In 1905 Weichardt was habilitated for hygiene and experimental therapy at the University of Erlangen, where he later became a professor and director of the Bayerische Bakteriologische Untersuchungsanstalt. He made contributions in his research of anaphylaxis, metabolism and fatigue. Weichardt postulated that there was a specific "toxin of fatigue", and in the early part of the 20th century he performed numerous experiments with chemical antitoxins in an effort to battle fatigue. With hygienist Adolf Dieudonné (1864-1944), he was co-author of Immunität, Schutzimpfung und Serumtherapie (Immunity, vaccination and serum therapy).

== Associated eponym ==
- Weichardt's reaction: Test based on the change of surface tension when antigen and antibody react with each other in specific dilutions.
