= Khodadad =

Khodadad (Persian: خداداد) may refer to:

- Khodadad, Hormozgan, a village in Iran
- Khodadad, Kerman, a village in Iran
- Khodadad, Zarand, a village in Kerman Province, Iran
- Khodadad, Razavi Khorasan, a village in Iran
- Khodadad, alternate name of Keryeh Sheykh Ali Khodadad, a village in Iran
- Khodadad, alternate name of Kalateh-ye Khodadad, a village in Iran
- Khodadad Azizi (born 1971), Iranian footballer
- Khudadat bey Malik-Aslanov (1879 – 1935), politician of the Azerbaijan Democratic Republic
- Behzad Khodadad (born 1981), Iranian Taekwondo athlete
- Khodadad Mirza Farman Farmaian (1928–2015), Iranian nobleman

== See also ==
- Khodadadi (disambiguation)
- Khudadad, another for the Kingdom of Mysore in India
- Khudadad of Kalat, ruler of the princely state of Kalat in British India
- Khudadad Khan (1888–1971), personnel of the British Indian Army, awarded the Victoria Cross during World War I
