= Deodato =

Deodato may refer to:

- Eumir Deodato (born 1942), Brazilian crossover music pianist, composer, arranger, and record producer
- Cláudio Deodato (1947–2011), Brazilian footballer
- Deodato Arellano (1844–1899), propagandist and first president of the Katipunan Philippine revolutionary society
- Deodato Bocconi (died 1477), Roman Catholic prelate who served as Bishop of Ajaccio
- Deodato Cosmati (1225–1303), one of the Cosmati family of Roman sculptor-architects and mosaicists
- Deodato Guinaccia (c. 1510 – 1585), Italian painter of the Renaissance period
- Deodato Orlandi (died before 1331), Italian painter who worked in Lucca and Pisa
- Mike Deodato (born 1963), pseudonym of Brazilian comic book artist Deodato Taumaturgo Borges Filho
- Ruggero Deodato (1939–2022), Italian film director,
- Deodato 2, a 1973 album by Brazilian keyboardist Eumir Deodato

== See also ==
- Deodat, a similar name
- Diodato, Italian pop singer
