= Bogdany =

Bogdany refers to the following places in Poland:

- Bogdany, Braniewo County
- Bogdany, Olsztyn County

== See also ==
- Bogdani, a surname
