= Adeodatus =

Adeodatus or Adeodato are given names meaning "given by God". Notable people with these names include:

- Pope Adeodatus I (also known as Pope Deusdedit I), pope from 614 to 618
- Pope Adeodatus II (sometimes referred to as Pope Adeodatus I), pope from 672 to 676
- Deodatus of Nevers (died 679), saint and Bishop of Nevers, also called Adeodatus
- Adeodatus (372–388), son of Augustine of Hippo
- Adeodato Giovanni Piazza (1884–1957), Italian friar and cardinal
- Guglielmo Adeodato (died 1540), Italian bishop
- Adeodato Malatesta (1806–1891), Italian painter
- Adeodato Barreto (1905–1937), Luso-Goan poet
- Adeodato López (1906–1957), Mexican footballer
