= Dongwon Industries =

Seafood company in Seoul, South Korea

Dongwon Industries, Co., Ltd.
- Native name: 동원산업주식회사
- Type: Public
- Traded as: KRX: 006040
- Industry: Fishing
- Founded: 16 April 1969; 57 years ago
- Founder: Kim Jae-chul
- Headquarters: Seoul and Busan, South Korea
- Area served: Worldwide

Korean name
- Hangul: 동원산업
- Hanja: 東遠產業
- RR: Dongwon saneop
- MR: Tongwŏn sanŏp
- Website: www.dwml.co.kr/eng

Dongwon Industries, Co., Ltd. (Korean: 동원산업주식회사) is a South Korean seafood company headquartered in Seoul, South Korea.

== Background ==
Founded by Kim Jae-chul in 1969, it is the main representative of the Dongwon chaebol, a family conglomerate comprising 15 affiliates. Dongwon is South Korea's largest fishing company and the owner of StarKist Tuna. Kim Nam-jung, the son of Kim Jae-chul, serves as the current chairman and CEO of Dongwon Group.

Korea Investment Holdings, one of Korea's largest financial companies, was a financial branch of Dongwon Chaebol. The firm is now owned and managed by Kim Nam-goo, another son of Kim Jae-chul and billionaire investor in Korea.
