= Adolf Dieudonné =

German physician (1864–1944)

Adolf Dieudonné (29 August 1864 – 25 October 1944) was a German physician and hygienist, born in Stuttgart.

He studied medicine at the University of Tübingen, the Friedrich Wilhelm University of Berlin, the Ludwig-Maximilians-Universität München, and the University of Würzburg, and, from 1888, was a physician in the Bavarian army. Several years later, he was stationed at the Imperial Health Office in Berlin, where he was exposed to the latest developments of Emil von Behring (1854–1917). In 1897, under the direction of Robert Koch (1843–1910), he along with Georg Gaffky (1850–1918) and Richard Pfeiffer (1858–1945), researched the bubonic plague in Bombay. After his return to Germany, he spent six years as a military physician in Würzburg, where in 1898 he obtained his habilitation in hygiene at the University of Würzburg.

In 1904, he was appointed to the Kriegsakademie in Munich, where he instructed military officers, while at the same time teaching classes at the Ludwig-Maximilians-Universität München. In 1906, he became an honorary professor, and three years later was appointed as Ministerialrat and Medizinalreferent in the Ministry of the Interior, subsequently becoming head of Bavarian Aid Services.

For most of his career he dealt with the issue of controlling outbreaks of disease, in the civilian as well as in the military sector. In his various roles he was involved with bubonic plague, cholera, typhoid, Spanish flu, diphtheria, scarlet fever, et al.

His name is associated with "Dieudonné agar", which is a medium used for cultivation and detection of vibrio cholerae.

Among his written works are the following:

- Immunität, Schutzimpfung und Serumtherapie, (with Wolfgang Weichardt) – Immunity, vaccination and serum therapy.
- Bacterial food poisoning; a concise exposition of the etiology, bacteriology, pathology, symptomatology, prophylaxis, and treatment of so-called ptomaine poisoning
