= Trilulilu =

Romanian website

- Available in: Romanian
- Founded: January 2007; 19 years ago
- Dissolved: June 2020; 6 years ago
- Headquarters: Cluj-Napoca, Romania
- Owner: Alexis Bonte
- Founders: Sergiu Biriş; Andrei Dunca
- Key people: Sergiu Biriş (CEO)
- Website: www.trilulilu.ro
- Registration: Optional (required to upload, rate, and comment on videos)
- Current status: Inactive (as of 21/03/21)

Trilulilu was the biggest user-generated content (UGC) website in Romania on which users could view, upload and share videos, images and audio files. The website was created on January 22, 2007, after a few weeks of beta testing, by two Romanian entrepreneurs Sergiu Biriş and Andrei Dunca. In May 2008 the French businessman Alexis Bonte bought 41% of the company for around US$1.5 million, and with the previous 10% that he owned became the largest shareholder.

The company was based in Cluj-Napoca, and used Adobe Flash Video technology to display a wide variety of user-generated video content, including movie clips, TV clips, and music videos, as well as amateur content such as video blogging and short original videos. The website also features pictures and audio files uploaded by the registered users. The website also had an online shop where internet users could buy Trilulilu merchandise such as t-shirts, mugs, badges and other products inscribed with the two mascots: the Trilulilu guy and the Crocodile.

Trilulilu was one of the most visited websites in Romania. The site had over 2.2 million unique visitors per month and 7 million overall visitors per month. The total number of registered users topped 500,000 and user related video uploads amounted to over 23,000 hours of content. Trilulilu.ro was placed as eighth in the top 10 most visited websites by Romanians at the end of 2008 and second in the top 10 most visited websites from Romania in 2009, reaching the first position in July and August 2009.

Unregistered users could watch the pictures, videos or listen to audio files, while registered users were permitted to upload files, create groups and shows, create play-lists, rate and comment on users content and profiles, send virtual gifts and communicate with other registered users using the internal messaging system. The registered users were called "trilulişti".

Images and videos that were considered to contain potentially offensive content were available only to registered users over the age of 18. The uploading of pictures and videos containing defamation, pornography, copyright violations, and material encouraging criminal conduct was prohibited by Trilulilu's terms of service.

In February 2011, Trilulilu signed a deal with Universal Music allowing the website to stream any song licensed by Universal Music (but only for users in Romania), splitting advertising revenues between Trilulilu and Universal Music. A similar deal was previously signed with Romanian label Roton. In May 2020, Trilulilu was acquired by Digitap World SRL, Romanian company based in Cluj-Napoca. The site closed in July 2020.
