= Christopher Bogdan =

United States Air Force general

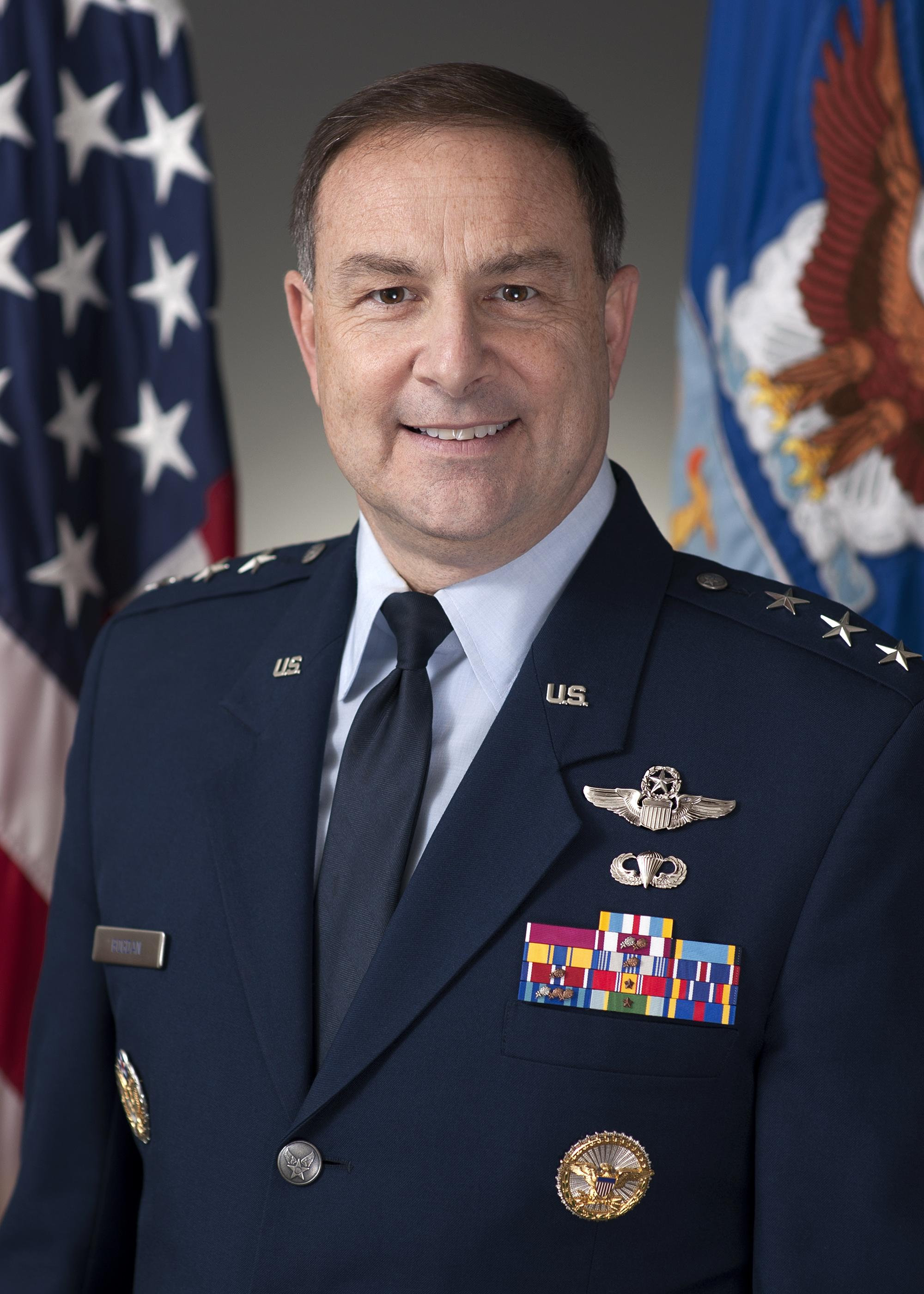
- Lt. General Christopher Bogdan
- Military career
- Allegiance: United States of America
- Branch: United States Air Force
- Service years: 1983–2017
- Rank: Lieutenant general

Christopher Carl Bogdan is a retired United States Air Force Lieutenant General who served as the Program Executive Officer for the F-35 Lightning II Joint Program Office in Arlington, Virginia. Previously, he was the Deputy Program Executive Officer. Before that, he served as the Program Executive Officer and Program Director, KC-46 Tanker Modernization Directorate, Aeronautical Systems Center at Wright-Patterson Air Force Base in Dayton, Ohio.

== Career ==
Born and raised in New York City, Bogdan was commissioned as a second lieutenant on June 1, 1983, at the United States Air Force Academy. After graduation, Bogdan went on to become a distinguished graduate from squadron officer school located at Maxwell Air Force Base in Alabama. Bogdan is also a distinguished graduated of the United States Air Force Test Pilot School at Edwards Air Force Base in California. Bogdan became a test pilot with more than 3,200 hours in over 35 different aircraft, including the KC-135, F-111 and F-16. As of 2021, Bogdan is a senior vice president at Booz Allen Hamilton.

== Education ==
- 1983: Distinguished graduate, Bachelor of Science degree in aeronautical engineering, U.S. Air Force Academy, Colorado Springs, Colorado
- 1989: Distinguished graduate, Squadron Officer School, Maxwell AFB, Alabama
- 1990: Distinguished graduate, USAF Test Pilot School, Edwards AFB, California
- 1994: Master of Science degree in engineering management, with distinction, California State University, Northridge
- 1995: Distinguished graduate, Air Command and Staff College, Maxwell AFB, Alabama
- 1998: Air War College, by correspondence
- 2000: Distinguished graduate, Master of Science degree in national resource strategy, Industrial College of the Armed Forces, Fort Lesley J. McNair, Washington, D.C.
- 2005: Advanced Program Managers Course, Defense Systems Management College, Fort Belvoir, Virginia
- 2006: U.S. Air Force Senior Leadership Course, Center for Creative Leadership, Greensboro, North Carolina
- 2007: National Security Management Course, Maxwell School of Citizenship, Syracuse University, New York
- 2013: Cyber Operations Executive Course, Air University, Maxwell AFB, Alabama

== Effective dates of promotion ==
Promotions
Insignia	Rank	Date
	Lieutenant general	December 6, 2012
	Major general	November 18, 2011
	Brigadier general	December 9, 2008
	Colonel	August 1, 2002
	Lieutenant colonel	September 1, 1998
	Major	March 1, 1995
	Captain	June 1, 1987
	First lieutenant	June 1, 1985
	Second lieutenant	June 1, 1983

== Major awards and decorations ==
US Air Force Command Pilot Badge

Defense Superior Service Medal
Legion of Merit with oak leaf cluster
Meritorious Service Medal with six oak leaf clusters
Air Force Commendation Medal with oak leaf cluster
Aerial Achievement Medal
Air Force Achievement Medal
