= Božidar Belojević =

Yugoslav footballer (1928–1997)

Personal information
- Full name: Božidar Belojević
- Date of birth: 25 December 1928
- Place of birth: Podgorica, Kingdom of Serbs, Croats and Slovenes
- Date of death: 24 April 1997 (aged 68)
- Place of death: Podgorica, Montenegro, FR Yugoslavia
- Position: Goalkeeper

Senior career*
Years	Team	Apps	(Gls)
1946–1952	Njegoš Lovćenac		
1952–1955	Partizan	16	(0)
1955–1960	Budućnost Titograd		
1960–1962	Borovo		
- * Club domestic league appearances and goals

Božidar Belojević (Serbian Cyrillic: Божидар Белојевић; 25 December 1928 – 24 April 1997) was a Yugoslavian professional footballer who played for FK Partizan.

== Biography ==
Belojević was born on 25 December 1928 in Podgorica. He started playing football as a boy, before the Second World War in Bar, and after the war he colonized in Lovćenac, in Bačka, with his parents, and there he started playing football again in the newly founded club Njegoš, together with his brother.

After one visit of Partizan after returning from Hungary, in 1952, Partizan and Njegoš played a friendly match that ended 1–1 and Belojević kept a clean sheet. Immediately after the match, Partizan signed him and went on a tour of South America.

Belojević was with Partizan until 1955, when he returned to his native Montenegro and continued his career with Budućnost from the then Titograd. He played until 1961, and one year before the end of his career he played for Borovo, then in the Second League.

As a member of Partizan, Belojević participated in winning two Yugoslav Cups, in 1952 and 1954. He died on 24 April 1997.

== Honours ==
Partizan

- Yugoslav Cup: 1952, 1954
