= Jack Bogdanski =

American lawyer and academic

John A. "Bojack" Bogdanski
- Born: Newark, New Jersey, U.S.
- Education: Saint Peter's College (BA); Stanford University (JD)
- Occupations: Lawyer, academic, blogger
- Employer: Lewis & Clark Law School
- Notable work: "Federal Tax Valuation"

John A. Bogdanski is an American lawyer and academic. He is a professor of law and the Douglas K. Newell Faculty Scholar at Lewis & Clark Law School in Portland, Oregon, United States.

== Career ==
Bogdanski is a native of Newark, New Jersey. He graduated summa cum laude with a degree in classical languages and literature from Saint Peter's College, New Jersey, in 1975. He received his Juris Doctor degree in 1978 from Stanford Law School, where he was an editor of the Stanford Law Review and a member of the Order of the Coif. In 1978–79, he served as a law clerk to Judge Alfred T. Goodwin of the U.S. Court of Appeals for the Ninth Circuit.

He has taught at Lewis & Clark since leaving practice as a partner with the law firm Stoel Rives LLP in Portland in 1986. In fall 1992, he was a visiting professor of law at Stanford University, and in the fall of 1999, he was of counsel to Stoel Rives on a full-time basis. His primary teaching and research emphasis is on federal taxes. He is a five-time winner of Lewis & Clark's Leo Levenson Award for excellence in law teaching, most recently in 2003.

Bogdanski is a former member of the Commissioner's Advisory Group of the U.S. Internal Revenue Service.

== Blogging and published works ==
Bogdanski has been referred to as a "notable local blogger," having published Jack Bog's Blog since 2002. He has described his politics as centrist and once estimated that he visits dozens of blogs per day researching stories. He was interviewed on local blogging by Oregon Public Broadcasting's Oregon Territory in 2004, and was the only blogger quoted in an OPB radio story on the topic in 2007.

He has written articles on federal tax law, and he is the Closely Held Businesses and Valuation columnist for Estate Planning. He has been a frequent speaker at continuing education programs on tax law. He is cited as an expert on taxation in national news stories. He was a founder of the group "People Against Nuclear Dumping at Hanford" in the 1980s.

He is the author of the treatise Federal Tax Valuation and was the editor-in-chief of the journal Valuation Strategies.
