= Dieudonné =

Dieudonné is a French name normally meaning "Gift of God", and thus similar to the Greek-derived Theodore, Hebrew-derived Matthew, or the Spanish Diosdado. It may refer to:

== People ==
=== Given name ===
- Dieudonné Cédor (1925–2010), Haitian painter
- Dieudonné Costes (1892–1973), French aviator
- Dieudonné Disi (born 1980), Rwandan long-distance and cross county runner
- Dieudonne Dolassem (born 1979), Cameroonian judoka
- Dieudonné Sylvain Guy Tancrède de Dolomieu or Déodat Gratet de Dolomieu (1750–1801), French geologist
- Dieudonné Ella Oyono, Gabonese-Quebecois politician
- Dieudonné Ganga (born c. 1946), Congolese politician and diplomat
- Dieudonné Gnammankou, Beninean historian
- Dieudonné de Gozon (fl. 1346–53), French knight
- Dieudonné-Félix Godefroid or Félix Godefroid (1818–1897), Belgian harpist
- Dieudonné Jamar (1878 – after 1905), Belgian racing cyclist
- Dieudonné Kabongo (1950–2011), Congolese-born Belgian humorist and actor
- Dieudonné Kalilulika (born 1981), Congolese football player
- Dieudonné Kayembe Mbandakulu (born 1945), Congolese military chief
- Dieudonné Kwizera (born 1967), Burundian middle-distance runner
- Dieudonné LaMothe (born 1954), Haitian long-distance runner
- Dieudonné Londo (born 1976), Gabonese football player
- Louis XIV (1638–1715), King of France, born Louis-Dieudonné
- Dieudonné M'bala M'bala (born 1966), French comedian and political activist, convicted for hate speech and slander
- Dieumerci Mbokani (born 1985), Congolese football player, born Dieudonné Mbokani
- Dieudonné Minoungou (born 1981), Burkinabè football player
- Dieudonné Mondjo, Gabonese politician
- Dieudonné Ndomaté, Central African politician
- Dieudonné Owona (born 1986), Cameroonian football player
- Dieudonné Saive (1889–1973), Belgian small arms designer
- Dieudonné Yarga (born 1986), Burkinabè football player
- Dieudonné Yougbaré (1917–2011), Burkinabé Roman Catholic bishop

=== Surname ===
- Adolf Dieudonné (1864–1944), German physician and hygienist
- Albert Dieudonné (1889–1976), French actor and film director
- Frédéric Dieudonné (born 1969), French writer and film-maker
- Georges Oltramare (1896–1960), Swiss author and fascist politician who used the pseudonym Charles Dieudonné
- Henri Charles Ferdinand Marie Dieudonné or Henri, Count of Chambord (1820–1883), disputedly King of France
- Jean Dieudonné (1906–1992), French mathematician
- Nabatingue Tokomon Dieudonné or Nabatingue Toko (born 1952), Chadian football player
- Pierre Dieudonné (born 1947), Belgian auto racing driver and journalist

=== Nickname ===
- Philip II of France (1165–1223), King of France, also known as Dieudonné

== See also ==
- Dieudonné, Oise, a commune in northern France

== See also ==
- Deusdedit (disambiguation), meaning "God has given", the name of several ecclesiastical figures
