= Adeodato López =

Mexican footballer (1906-1957)

Personal information
- Date of birth: 1 February 1906
- Date of death: 4 May 1957 (aged 51)
- Position: Forward

Senior career*
Years	Team	Apps	(Gls)
- Germania F.V.
- Club América

International career
1923	Mexico	6	(6)
1928	Mexico Olympic	1	(0)
- * Club domestic league appearances and goals

Adeodato López (1 February 1906 – 4 May 1957) was a Mexican footballer. He was part of Mexico's squad at the 1928 Summer Olympics in the Netherlands, but he did not play in any matches.

== Career statistics ==
=== International ===
National team	Year	Apps	Goals
Mexico	1923	6	6
Total		6	6

=== International goals ===
Scores and results list Mexico's goal tally first.

No	Date	Venue	Opponent	Score	Result	Competition
1.	1 January 1923	Campo Marte, Guatemala	Guatemala	3–1	3–2	Friendly
2.	7 January 1923	Campo Marte, Guatemala	Guatemala	3–0	4–1	Friendly
3.	7 January 1923	Campo Marte, Guatemala	Guatemala	4–1	4–1	Friendly
4.	9 December 1923	Parque España, Mexico	Guatemala	1–0	2–1	Friendly
5.	16 December 1923	Parque España, Mexico	Guatemala	1–1	3–3	Friendly
6.	16 December 1923	Parque España, Mexico	Guatemala	3–3	3–3	Friendly
