= Božidar Ćosović =

Yugoslav officer

- Божидар Ћосовић
- Born: 1916; Brezova, Kingdom of Serbia
- Died: 4/5 June 1943; Brekovo, Territory of the Military Commander in Serbia
- Military career
- Allegiance: Kingdom of Yugoslavia: Government of National Salvation
- Branch: Pećanac Chetniks
- Rank: Voivode (self-proclaimed)
- Nickname: Boža Javorski
- Commands: Javor Detachment

Božidar Ćosović (1916–1943) was Yugoslav gendarmerie officer, carpenter and driver from Brezova, known as a military officer during the World War II. Ćosović held the rank of self-proclaimed voivode of Pećanac Chetniks and commanded the Javor Detachment. Karchmar described Ćosović as free-booting semi-bandit. Vladimir Dedijer referred to him as village bully. Ćosović was given a title of voivode by Kosta Pećanac who named a group of irregulars as Javor Chetnik Detachment. Many sources say that he was self-proclaimed voivode.

On 11 July 1941, Ćosović robbed and killed a group of 5 Muslims in Crvena Gora near Ivanjica. In August 1941, Ćosović and Đura Smederevac for a short time joined their detachments with forces of voivode Đekić to establish Zlatibor Detachment of 160 men. On 28 August, they attacked Ustaše controlled stronghold in Štitkovo, killed two members of Croatian Home Guard and captured and destroyed their stronghold. Subsequently, they split their forces and retreated. Ćosović and his Javor Detachment retreated to Moravički district and captured Ivanjica on 31 August after it was first deserted by Germans. In mid-October, Ćosović captured Arilje and Ivanjica. On 5 September, Chetniks under Ćosović killed 16 Muslims, including minors. Few of the victims were tortured before execution.

Ćosović, a self-proclaimed Chetnik voivode and ex gendarmerie officer, tried to secure retreat of Germans and their arms from Užice. Ćosović again attacked Ivanjica during the night between 1 and 2 November 1941. Ćosović's Chetniks and legalised Chetniks of Miloje Mojsilović executed 14 captured Partisans of Kopanik regiment on November 19 near village Lisa near Ivanjica. Five captured Partisans escaped before execution.

At the end of 1941, Ćosović also legalized the Javor Chetnik Detachment under his command which was renamed to Javor Independent Chetnik Detachment with code C-37. Since he disobeyed, his detachment was disbanded, but he kept his arms and became illegal and had numerous military conflicts with Italian and German forces and Sandžak Muslim militia.

During the night between 14 and 15 October 1942, Ćosović and his Javor detachment of legalized Chetniks attacked German post and antimony mine in Lisa near Ivanjica.

Zvonko Vučković had a very negative opinion about Ćosović and described how he disobeyed orders and conducted many acts of violence and robbery. So, in 1943, Draža Mihailović ordered Uroš Katanić, leader of Moravica Brigade, to eliminate Ćosović. Katanić in early June tracked down Ćosović and captured him in Brekovo near Arilje. Ćosović was executed in the night of 4–5 June 1943, alongside his girlfriend and few associates. His unit was disbanded and 127 Chetniks were transferred to Moravica brigade.

== Sources ==
- Dedijer, Vladimir (1970). Od 6 aprila 1941 do 27 novembra 1942. Prosveta.
- Kesar, Jovan; Lukić, Dragoje (1990). Ne osećam se krivim. Akvarijus. ISBN 9788675030133.
- Jončić, Koča (1985). Narodni ustanak i borbe za Kraljevo 1941. godine: zbornik radova naučnog skupa. Narodna knj. ISBN 9788633100014.
- Karchmar, Lucien (1973). Draz̆a Mihailović and the Rise of the C̆etnik Movement, 1941-1942. Department of History, Stanford University.
- Ćuković, Mirko (1964). Sandžak: Na osnovu sakupljenog i obrađenog materijala knjigu napisao Mirko Ćuković. Nolit.
- Живковић, Милутин Д. (2017). Санџак 1941–1943. Филозофски Фалултет, Универзитет у Београду.
- Radanović, Milan (2016). Kazna i zločin: Snage Kolaboracije u Srbiji. Rosa Luxemburg Stiftung.
