= StarKist =

Tuna brand

- Founded: 1917
- Headquarters: Reston, Virginia, {{{location_country}}}
- Country of origin: United States
- CEO: Edward Min
- Parent: Dongwon Industries

StarKist Tuna is a brand of tuna produced by StarKist Co., an American company formerly based in Pittsburgh's North Shore that is now wholly owned by Dongwon Industries of South Korea. It was purchased by Dongwon from the American food manufacturer Del Monte Foods on June 24, 2008, for slightly more than $300 million. In 2022, the headquarters were moved to Reston, Virginia.

== History ==
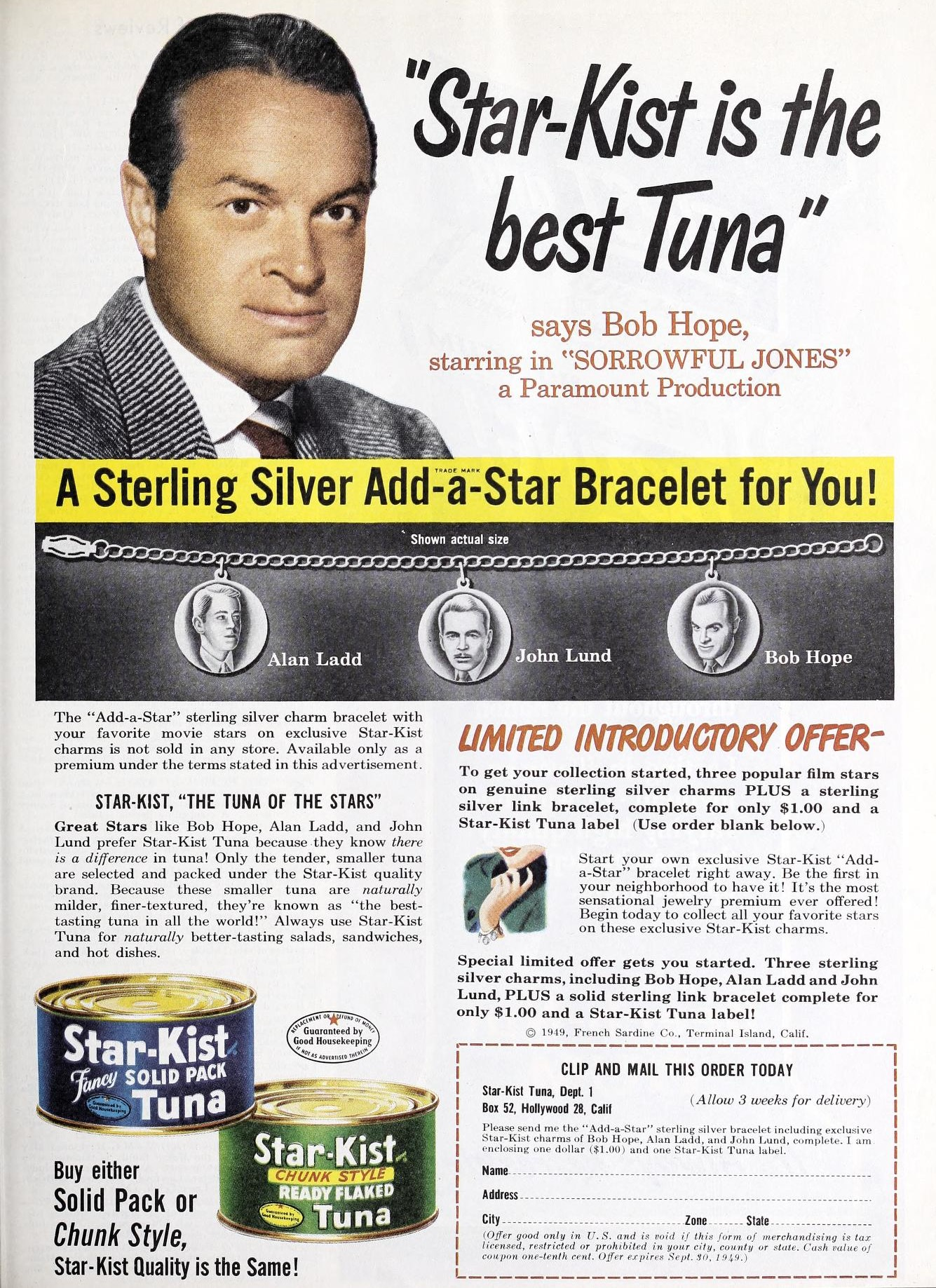
1949 ad for the product with Bob Hope

StarKist was founded in 1917 in San Pedro, California (known historically as "Fish Harbor") as the French Sardine Company of California, by Martin J. Bogdanovich (an immigrant from Croatia) and several partners. Bogdanovich is known for his innovations related to refrigeration of the seafood product with crushed ice. They first marketed tuna under the Starkist name in 1942. Bogdanovich died in 1944 and his son Joseph took over the business. The company changed its name to Starkist Foods in 1953; at the time, its facility on Terminal Island was the largest tuna processing facility in the world.

Since 1961 its mascot has been Charlie the Tuna, an anthropomorphic cartoon tuna. Commercials usually featured the phrase "Sorry, Charlie". StarKist was acquired by the H.J. Heinz Company in 1963.

In 1984, the Terminal Island cannery operations were shut down. In 1988, Heinz spun off its pet food brands (including its flagship 9Lives cat food brand, which was introduced as a tuna-based cat food in 1959) into a separate division and Joseph Bogdanovich became a Heinz vice-chairman. Heinz sold both divisions to Del Monte in 2002.

In August 2015, StarKist settled a class-action lawsuit claiming that the company was guilty of deliberately "under-filling" five-ounce cans of tuna. Earlier that same month, StarKist was sued for allegedly colluding with Bumble Bee Foods and Chicken of the Sea to fix prices.

On October 18, 2018, StarKist agreed to plead guilty to a felony price fixing charge as part of a broad collusion investigation of the canned tuna industry by the United States Department of Justice. On September 11, 2019, StarKist was fined $100 million, the maximum statutory fine.

In September 2019, the plaintiffs who had signed up for the class-action lawsuit that was "settled" in August 2015 were finally paid their share of the settlement. Plaintiffs who signed up for the $50 in tuna certificates received a coupon good for $5.03 provided they buy at least three Starkist products totaling more than that amount. Plaintiffs who signed up for the $25 cash received a PayPal payment of $2.38 representing their share of the settlement after the law firm's costs had been deducted.

StarKist moved its corporate headquarters to Reston, Virginia in 2022.

== See also ==
- Tunagate
