= Martin J. Bogdanovich =

American businessman (1882–1944)

- Born: Martin Joseph Bogdanovich; November 5, 1882; Island of Vis, Croatia
- Died: June 18, 1944 (aged 61); San Pedro, California, U.S.
- Burial place: Calvary Cemetery, Los Angeles
- Occupations: Fisherman; Businessman
- Known for: Founding Starkist

Martin Joseph Bogdanovich (November 5, 1882 – June 18, 1944) was a Croatian American fisherman, entrepreneur, and founder of the seafood company now known as StarKist.

== Early life ==
Bogdanovich was born on November 5, 1882, on the Island of Vis in the Adriatic Sea off the Dalmatian Coast of Croatia, the son of Josip Bogdanović and Lukrecija Petronila Bogdanović.

In 1908, at the age of 26, Bogdanovich emigrated to the United States.

== Career ==
Bogdanovich began sardine fishing in Fish Harbor on Terminal Island in 1910. In 1917, Bogdanovich incorporated the French Sardine Company. The company quickly became a success, and Bogdanovich established himself as a leader in the California fish canning industry. Bogdanovich was noted for revolutionizing the fishing industry by mechanically refrigerating their fish with crushed ice.

In the 1940s, Bogdanovich turned his operations to tuna canning when California's coastal supply of sardines began to decrease. Under Bogdanovich's leadership, in 1942, the company began marketing its products under the "Star-Kist" brand name.

Bogdanovich was active in the company from its inception in 1917 until his death in 1944, when his son Joseph fully took over the family business. At the time of Bogdanovich's death, he had built his company into one of the largest tuna canneries in the world.

== Personal life and death ==
In 1908, Bogdanovich married Antoinette Šimić, with whom he had one son and six daughters.

Bogdanovich died from a heart attack on June 18, 1944, in San Pedro, California at the age of 61. He is buried in Calvary Cemetery in Los Angeles.

== Legacy ==
The Martin J. Bogdanovich Recreation Center in San Pedro is named after him.

== See also ==
- StarKist
