= Małgorzata Bogdan =

Polish statistician

Małgorzata Bogdan is a Polish statistician, a professor of the Mathematical Institute of the University of Wrocław in Poland, and a professor in the Department of Statistics of Lund University in Sweden. Her research includes work on feature selection, the lasso, regularization, and applications in genomics, statistical finance, and cosmology.

== Education and career ==
Bogdan was a student at the Wrocław University of Science and Technology. She earned a master's degree in applied mathematics in 1992 and completed her Ph.D. in mathematical statistics in 1996, under the supervision of Teresa Ledwina.

She continued at the university as an assistant professor from 1997 to 2011, and after completing a habilitation in 2009, as an associate professor from 2011 to 2016.

In 2015, she moved to the University of Wrocław as an associate professor. Since 2018, she has also been a guest professor at Lund University. In 2020, she was granted the title of professor by the president of Poland.

== Recognition ==
Bogdan was the 2020 recipient of the Hugo Steinhaus Award of the Polish Mathematical Society, one of the three highest prizes of the society, recognizing her lifetime contributions to the applications of mathematics.

She was named as a Fellow of the Institute of Mathematical Statistics in 2024, "for innovative contributions to high-dimensional statistics with a focus on multiple testing and variable selection, insightful connections between Bayesian and Frequentist statistics, and leadership in forging scientific collaborations across geographical areas and fields of study".
