= Leiner Health Products =

Leiner Health Products was a company based in Carson, California, and was one of America's largest manufacturers of vitamins, minerals, herbal nutritional supplements, and generic medications. It was founded in 1973, and was owned by North Castle Partners, a private investment firm from Connecticut.

== Business deals ==
Leiner declared Chapter 11 bankruptcy in February 2002, blaming a sudden drop in the price of raw materials for the pharmaceutical industry, which in turn lowered industry prices for the products they manufacture. Surprised by the shift, Leiner was caught with a great deal of now-overpriced material on hand, and they elected to sell their products at a loss in order to maintain market position. They emerged from bankruptcy 42 days later, having paid 25 cents on the dollar for $80 million in debt, while deciding to re-focus their efforts on marketing to large chains. The price drop was later determined to have been caused by collusive price fixing by Hoffmann–La Roche and BASF, in what the United States Department of Justice termed the largest criminal antitrust conspiracy ever uncovered.

On March 10, 2003, Leiner entered into a business relationship with Dr. Reddy's Laboratories, the third-largest drug company in India. Under the terms of the agreement, Dr. Reddy would provide generic medications and components, which would in return be packaged and marketed by Leiner.

Leiner filed for bankruptcy again on March 10, 2008, citing difficulties related to poor results on a FDA inspection of the company's Fort Mill plant during an inspection in 2007. Leiner indicated that it plans to explore debt restructuring and a sale of the company, and will continue normal operations while doing so.

Leiner was sold to NBTY (Nature's Bounty) in June 2008 for over $400MM.

== Fort Mill accident ==
On April 26, 2006, a flash fire damaged a Leiner pharmaceutical plant in the Lakemont Business Park of Fort Mill, South Carolina. Fire chief David Jennings estimated damages to the plant at $1.1 million, and two of the plant's 600 workers were hospitalized with burns. The fire started in a mixing room, where the workers were blending components for a batch of ibuprofen, and evidence indicates that a spark from the mixing machine ignited a dust explosion.

== Complaints over business practices ==
In November 2001, the Federal Trade Commission filed a complaint against Leiner for deceptive labeling practices in some of its products containing acetaminophen. It cited numerous examples of Leiner products of this nature labeled with "Made in the U.S.A." statements and American flags, where the acetaminophen used in the manufacture was derived from foreign sources.

On several occasions, Leiner has been forced to recall vitamins or supplements containing iron, which were not packaged in child-proof containers as required by the Poison Prevention Packaging Act. On March 12, 2002, they recalled 14,000 bottles of "Nature's Valley Women's Formula Multivitamin", and on January 28, 2005, they recalled 13,000 bottles of "Long’s Central-Vite Multivitamins".

== Methamphetamine lawsuit ==
Nikky Joe Green, a member of the Oklahoma Highway Patrol, was murdered during a traffic stop in December 2003. The killer, Ricky Ray Malone, was allegedly in a drug-induced haze from methamphetamine use at the time he shot Green, and his car contained a mobile meth lab.

Green's widow, Linda Green, subsequently filed a lawsuit against several US drug manufacturers and retailers, including Leiner. In the suit, she claimed that the companies deliberately turned a blind eye toward the purchase of their products containing pseudoephedrine by criminals engaged in the manufacture of illegal drugs. She also claimed that the companies were negligent in deciding not to use a known manufacturing technique which would have rendered their drugs useless to meth cooks.
