= Božidar Liščić =

Croatian engineer (1929–2020)

Božidar Liščić (17 January 1929 – 19 April 2020) was a Croatian engineer and from 1997 a full member of the Croatian Academy of Sciences and Arts.

== Biography ==
Božidar Liščić was born in Karlovac on 17 January 1929. He received his B.Sc. in Mech. Engineering and Ph. D in Materials Science from the University of Zagreb. After graduation followed several specializations throughout Europe dealing mainly with the heat treatment technologies. Ending his life in industry early he came back in 1968 to the Faculty of Mechanical Engineering as a lecturer on heat treatment. Here he established Heat Treatment laboratory introducing new heat treatment technologies in a country for the first time. Experiments done for his PhD using an experimental quenching tank built by the Swiss company Borel shifted his attention to quenching which became his main interest.

His greatest scientific achievement is the invention of Temperature Gradient Method for quenching intensity measuring, recording and evaluation. Soon afterwards, an appropriate software package was developed with the aim of recording the quenching intensity for different quenchants and working conditions. This is enabled by measuring the heat flux density from a surface of a special probe developed earlier in a cooperation with the American company NANMAC, known as Liscic/NANMAC probe. The relevant computer program enables also to calculate the cooling curves at every arbitrary point of the round bar cross-section, as well as to predict the resulting microstructure and hardness after quenching.

Liščić died on 19 April 2020, at the age of 92.
