= Božidar Kljajević =

Serbian genealogist

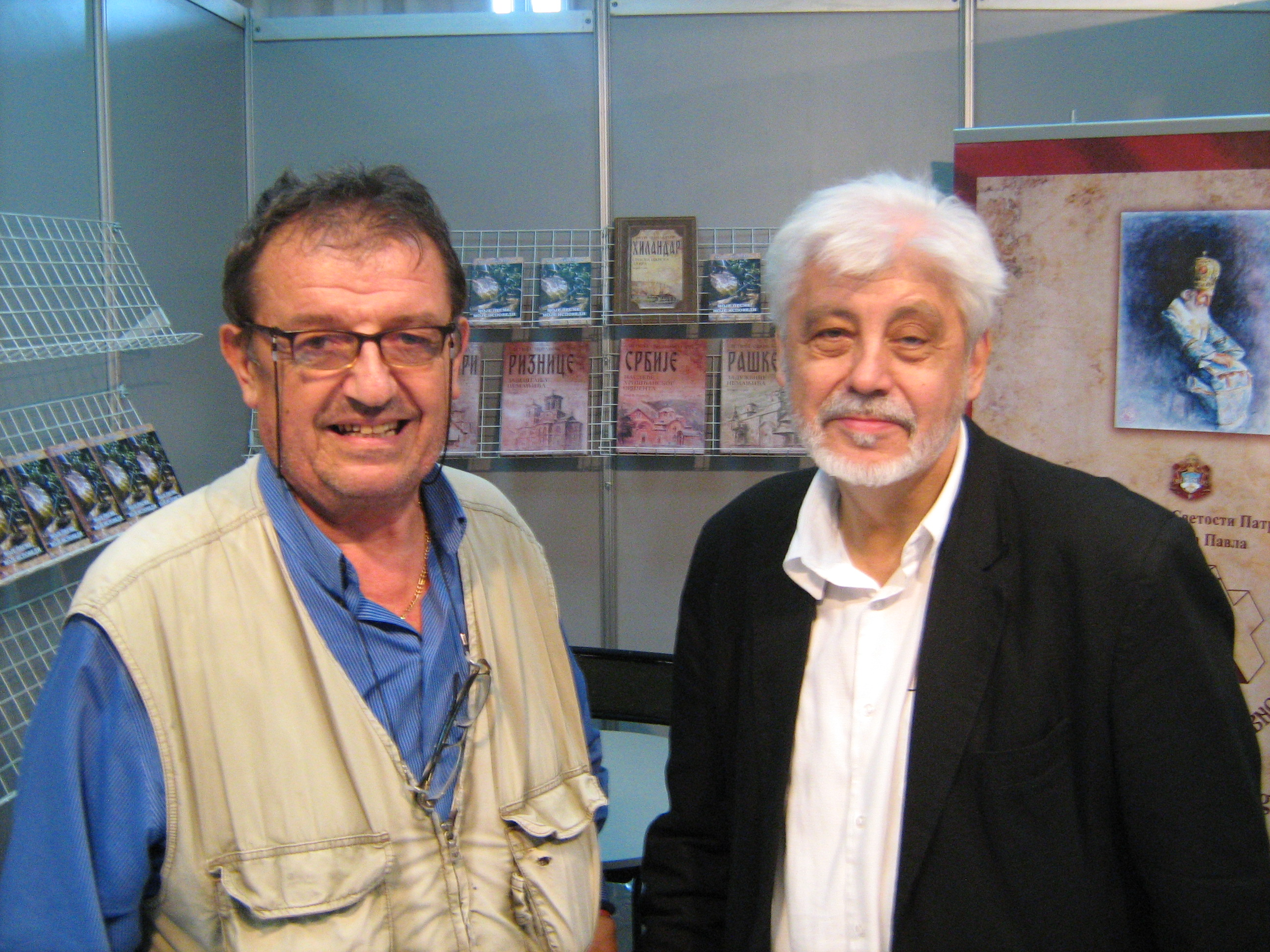
Božidar Kljajević and Milovan Vitezović at the 2013 Belgrade Book Fair.

Božidar Kljajević (Serbian Cyrillic: Божидар Кљајевић) is a historian, geographer and ethnologist. He has studied the genealogy of Serb families for four decades.

== Life ==
He was born in Kosanica, near Berane, on January 6, 1953.

== Work ==
- Božidar Kljajević (2006). Srpska luča. Srpska knjiga. ISBN 978-86-7564-398-2.
- Božidar Kljajević; Božidar M. Glogovac (2007). Krst prote Milutina: roman. Srpska knjiga. ISBN 978-86-7564-412-5.
- Božidar Kljajević (2006). Stanovništvo pljevaljskog kraja. Srpska Knjiga. ISBN 978-86-7564-401-9.
- Božidar Kljajević (2007). Pleme Nikšići u srpstvu: bratstva koja slave Svetog Luku. Srpska Knjiga. ISBN 978-86-7564-406-4.
- Božidar Kljajević. Stare srpske hercegovačke porodice.

== Personal life ==
He lives in Zemun with his wife. He has two sons.
