= Radu Bogdan =

American philosopher (born 1946)

- Born: 1946 (age 79–80)

Education
- Education: Stanford University (PhD)
- Thesis: The Pragmatics of Knowledge (1980)
- Doctoral advisor: Jaakko Hintikka

Philosophical work
- Era: 21st-century philosophy
- Region: Western philosophy
- Institutions: Tulane University
- Main interests: cognitive science, philosophy of mind

Radu J. Bogdan (born 1946) is an American philosopher and Professor Emeritus of Philosophy and Cognitive Science at Tulane University. He is known for his works on philosophy of mind.

== Books ==
- Why Me?: The Sociocultural Evolution of a Self-Reflective Mind, Cambridge University Press 2021
- Mindvaults: Sociocultural Grounds for Pretending and Imagining, MIT Press 2013
- Our Own Minds: Sociocultural Grounds for Self-Consciousness, MIT Press/Bradford Books 2010
- Predicative Minds: The Social Ontogeny of Propositional Thinking, MIT Press/Bradford Books 2009
- Minding Minds, MIT Press/Bradford Books 2000
- Interpreting Minds, MIT Press/Bradford Books 1997
- Grounds for Cognition, Lawrence Erlbaum 1994
