= Juozas Bagdonas (painter) =

Lithuanian painter

Juozas Bagdonas (11 December 1911 in Antrieji Vydeikiai, Kovno Governorate – 11 April 2005 in Plungė) was a Lithuanian painter and founder of the Samogitian Museum of Art.
