= Božidar Leiner =

- Born: 3 April 1919; Čukovec, near Ludbreg, Kingdom of Serbs, Croats and Slovenes (now Croatia)
- Died: 3 May 1942 (aged 23); Hrastovsko, near Ludbreg, Independent State of Croatia (now Croatia)

Božidar Dragutin Leiner (3 April 1919 – 3 May 1942) was a Croatian communist and Partisan.

Leiner was born in village Čukovec, near Ludbreg, on April 3, 1919 to a Croatian Jewish family. He was raised with three siblings, sister Adela, and brothers Valter and Josip. Leiner went to elementary school in Ludbreg, and high school in Zagreb. In Zagreb, Leiner enrolled the Faculty of Geodesy, University of Zagreb. As a young man, Leitner went to Ludbreg library where he met the supporters of the League of Communists of Croatia. In 1941, he was mobilized in the Croatian Home Guard, but soon after he escaped and joined the Partisans. During his stay with Partisans, Leiner mostly fought in Varaždin County. On May 3, 1942, Leiner and three of his comrades were ambushed and killed by Ustaše. He was buried three days later, in the part of the Ludbreg cemetery intended for the outlaws. On that spot, after the war, the monument was built in memory of Leiner and his comrades. In center of Hrastovsko Leiner bust stands to honor him.

== Bibliography ==
- Miličević, Žarko (2010). Kalnički partizanski odred. Varaždin: TIVA. ISBN 978-953-7304-83-6.
