= Khodadadi, Hormozgan =

Khodadadi خدادادي
- Village
- Location within Iran
- Coordinates: 28°42′08″N 55°45′23″E
- Country: Iran
- Province: Hormozgan
- County: Hajjiabad
- Bakhsh: Central
- Rural District: Dar Agah

Population (2006)
  - Total: 15
- Time zone: UTC+3:30 (IRST)
  - Summer (DST): UTC+4:30 (IRDT)

Khodadadi (Persian: خدادادي, also Romanized as Khodādādī; also known as Khodādād) is a village in Dar Agah Rural District, in the Central District of Hajjiabad County, Hormozgan Province, Iran. At the 2006 census, its population was 15, in 5 families.
