= Pavelas Bogdanovičius =

Lithuanian theoretical physicist (1946–2017)

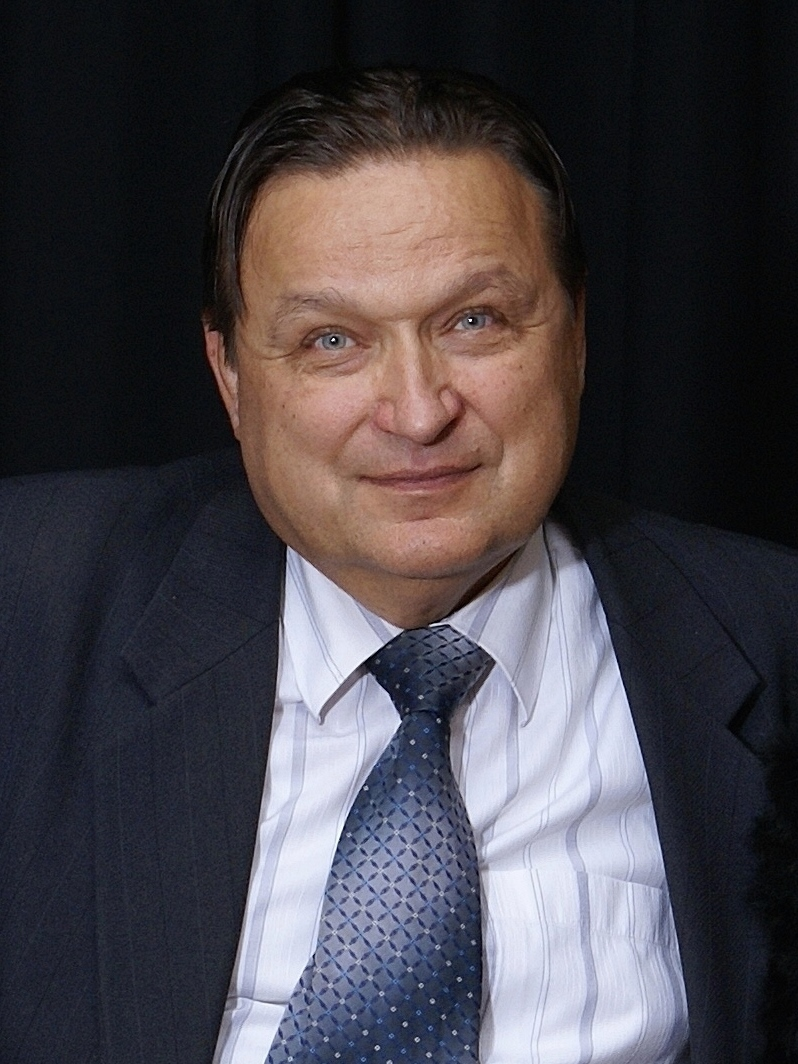
- Born: Pavelas Bogdanovičius; 12 September 1946; Vilnius, Lithuanian SSR
- Died: 10 August 2017 (aged 70); Klaipėda, Lithuania
- Resting place: Rokantiškės cemetery
- Education: Vilnius University
- Awards: Lithuanian Science Prize (2013)
- Scientific career
- Fields: Atomic physics
- Workplaces: Vilnius Pedagogical University
- Thesis: Įprastinio ir apibendrinto Hartrio ir Foko metodo taikymo klausimu (The application of the usual and generalized Hartree–Fock method)
- Doctoral advisor: Adolfas Jucys

Pavelas Bogdanovičius (12 September 1946 – 10 August 2017) was a Lithuanian theoretical physicist with a focus on atomic physics. He graduated from Vilnius University in 1969. He worked at the Institute of Physics and Mathematics, which was reorganized into the Institute of Physics and the Institute of Theoretical Physics and Astronomy. Bogdanovičius was a lecturer of quantum mechanics at the Vilnius Pedagogical University from 1994 to 2003. Bogdanovičius's most important work concerns the theory of multi-electron atoms as well as the spectral characteristics of multi-charged ions. He is the author of more than 130 scientific articles.

== Biography ==
=== Early life ===
Pavelas Bogdanovičius was born on 12 September 1946 in Vilnius. He graduated with a gold medal from the Vilnius 8th Gymnasium. Bogdanovičius successfully participated in mathematics and physics competitions from an early age, becoming acquainted with quantum mechanics from popular literature. He attended the Physics Faculty of Vilnius University headed by Adolfas Jucys, where from 1968 he performed quantum mechanical calculations. Bogdanovičius graduated in 1969 with honors. In 1973, he successfully defended his thesis on the application of the usual and generalized Hartree–Fock method (Įprastinio ir apibendrinto Hartrio ir Foko metodo taikymo klausimu).

=== Academic career ===
Bogdanovičius continued to actively work on developing the theory of atomic wave functions, implementing it in universal programs and applying it to obtain high-precision spectral characteristics and to interpret experimental spectra. These results were summarized in his doctoral dissertation on the development of atomic calculation methods, the creation and use of mathematical support for studying spectroscopic characteristics of discrete states of atoms and ions (Atomo skaičiavimų metodų išplėtojimas, matematinio aprūpinimo sukūrimas ir panaudojimas atomų ir jonų diskretinių būsenų spektroskopinėms charakteristikoms tirti), published in 1988 at the Institute of Spectroscopy of the Academy of Sciences of the Soviet Union. Bogdanovičius subsequently became a senior researcher at the Institute. Bogdanovičius worked at the Institute of Physics and Mathematics from 1968 to 1977, the Institute of Physics from 1977 to 1990, and the Institute of Theoretical Physics and Astronomy from 1990.

=== Later years ===
Bogdanovičius was a lecturer of quantum mechanics at the Vilnius Pedagogical University from 1994 to 2003. He was made a professor in 1999. Bogdanovičius also periodically headed the Lithuanian team at International Physics Olympiad. Bogdanovičius was awarded the Adolfas Jucys Prize in 2004 and the Lithuanian Science Prize in 2013. Bogdanovičius was a member of the Lithuanian Physics Society, the Lithuanian Astronomical Union, a board member of the Lithuanian Physical Society, and a member of the International Astronomical Union.

Bogdanovičius died on 10 August 2017 in Klaipėda. He was buried in Rokantiškės.

== Scientific work ==
Bogdanovičius's most important work concerns the theory of multi-electron atoms as well as the spectral characteristics of multi-charged ions. He is the author of more than 130 scientific articles.

Among Bogdanovičius's achievements are developing the transformed radial orbital method, proposing a method for selecting corrective configurations, as well as algorithms for partial matrix diagonalization. Bogdanovičius also implemented an effective method for the superposition of configurations. He proposed quasi-relativistic Hartree and Fock equations compatible with the Breit and Pauli approximation. On this basis, a complex of universal programs was created, which Bogdanovičius and his colleagues widely applied to the theoretical study of jump probabilities and lifetimes. He supervised the preparation of five to six doctoral dissertations, although he was not the official supervisor of all of them. In collaboration with foreign scientists, Bogdanovičius worked on scientific work at the Université Laval and Lund University.
