= Edmund Bogdanowicz =

Polish poet, writer and journalist

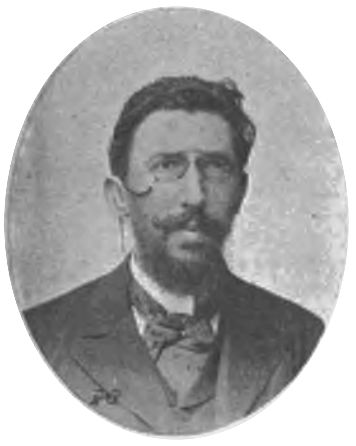
Edmund Bogdanowicz 1903 book photograph

Edmund Bogdanowicz (11 November 1857 – 25 July 1911) was a Polish poet, writer, and journalist.

== Biography ==
Edmund Bogdanowicz was born in Warsaw on 11 November 1857. Before his premature death, at 53, Bogdanowicz published a large number of poems and numerous articles in the leading Polish magazines of his day. Five of his books were published during his lifetime, the others posthumously. His poetry drew on the rhythms of Polish dance, the richness of nature, and the Polish countryside that he loved. He made frequent reference to Warsaw the city where he was raised and spent much of his adult life. Bogdanowicz had four sons by Maria Tymowska: Ernest Jozef (1887 - 1889), Marian Jozef (1888), Stanislaw Felix (1891) and Jan Jozef (1894). He died in Grodzisk Mazowiecki and is buried in the Powazki cemetery in Warsaw.

The most extensive biography of Bogdanowicz is that in the Anniversary edition of Kurier Warszawski, written while he was still alive. According to the Kurier, he completed high school (gimnazjum) in Warsaw and then studied maths at Dresden Technical University and then went on to the Universities of Warsaw and Petersburg. In Petersburg he worked for the magazine Kraj (Nation). Arriving in Warsaw in 1885, he joined the Kurier Warszawski, covering the Russian press and regional correspondence. He also published weekly literary columns called ‘Świstki’ (scrap-papers), as well as articles on education. He is described as a mathematician, biologist and the author of many popular science articles, ‘but above all else he is a poet.’ He usually wrote poetry under the pseudonym ‘Bożydar’ (synonymous with Bogdan) and science articles under 'Deodat'. Most of his poetry was published in the Kurier and the Anniversary edition of the magazine lists several dozen works (both poetry and essays) written between 1885 and 1896. In addition to his contributions to the Kurier, Bogdanowicz was also secretary of the editorial board. In his work, Bogdanowicz drew on his knowledge of Russian, German, Latin and Ancient Greek.

As well as writing for the Kurier, Bogdanowicz made contributions to other leading Polish publications of the day notably Klosy, Wiek, Tygodnik Illustrowany and Wedrowca. For a period, Bogdanowicz worked as a teacher at the Prof. Jakub Popowski school in Piotrków, where he also wrote for the Tygodnik Piotrkowski (Piotrków Weekly). In the period 1904 - 1906 Bogdanowicz ran two fortnightly publications for women Dobra Matka and Kobieta.

Bogdanowicz published several books including: Notatka popularna o przepowiedniach i naukowych hypotezach o przyszłości ziemi (essays) 1886, Pan Zagloba i Dyogenes (essays) 1903, Monologi i Wierse do Deklamacji (poetry) 1904, and three books for children:W Srebrnem (old Polish spelling) Krolestwie 1923, Blekitna Pantera 1906, Sepie Gniazdo 1922, (last two re-published jointly as Blekitna Pantera/Sepie Gniazdo 1991).

Early Life

Edmund Bogdanowicz was born into a Warsaw family of tradespeople. His paternal grandfather, Wincenty Bogdanowicz, was a butcher and his maternal one, Bartlomiej Cerazewski was a blacksmith. His grandmothers were Rozalia Slowik, wife of Wincenty, and Julia Grofs, wife of Bartlomiej. Edmund's father, Felix, was a prop-maker at the Warsaw Great Theatre and is listed in the 1854 census as a carpenter living at 474 Senatorska St (adjacent to the Great Theatre). Felix married Franciszka Cerazewska, whose occupation is described as running a fashion shop, in 1856, at which time he was still living in Senatorska Street. By the time of Edmund's birth the family had moved to 416 Krakowskie Przedmiescie.

Given his relatively humble origins it is surprising that Edmund attended three universities, became a poet, journalist and member of the editorial board of Poland's leading daily paper, Kurier Warszawski. The answer may lie in his father's connection the theatre. Felix Bogdanowicz's older sister, Zuzanna, was married to Jozef Swiergocki, a Warsaw actor and son of property owner Antoni Swiergocki. Like the Bogdanowicz family, Jozef Swiergocki lived in the housing block adjoining the Great Theatre. Edmund's godfather was Ludwik Panczykowski, a renowned actor (http://www.e-teatr.pl/pl/osoby/41635.html). Parish records show that Edmund's mother died when he was just three leaving him in the care of his father and, possibly, his aunt Zuzanna. Zuzanna had a son Jozef, who became a theatre official, and two daughters, one of whom, Aniela, married Ferdynand Robert Herse, co-owner of the large Herse department store in Warsaw's prestigious Marszalkowska Street (though originally in Senatorska St. where both Edmund's father and Uncle (Jozef) lived), and the other, Zuzanna Ludwika became an actress and married fellow actor Adolf Ostrowski.

Edmund's youngest son, Jan, a professor of medicine in Warsaw, describes, in his memoirs, a childhood during which his father helped the children put on plays in a wooden theatre built by their grandfather.
