= Brvenica =

Brvenica is a South Slavic toponym. It may refer to:

- Brvenica Municipality, North Macedonia
  - Brvenica, North Macedonia, village which is home to the municipal seat
- Brvenica, Raška, a village in Serbia

== See also ==
- Brvenik, a village in Serbia
- Brvenik Naselje, a village in Serbia
