= Bogdan (protovestijar) =

- protovestijar of the Serbian Empire
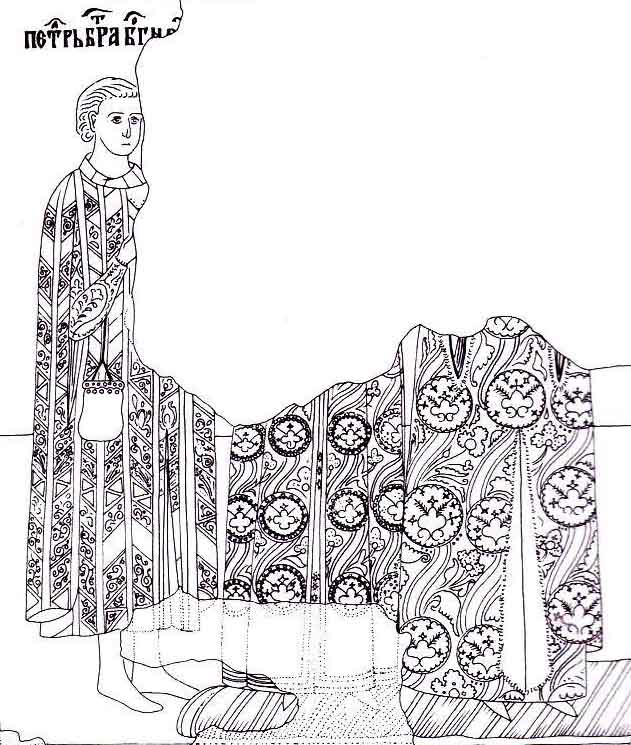
- Ruined ktitor composition from Kalenić. Bogdan's brother Petar to the left, Bogdan in the centre and Despot Stefan to the right.
- Born: Second half of the 14th century
- Died: After 1426
- Spouse: Milica
- Occupation: Financial manager

Bogdan (fl. 1407–26), was a Serbian magnate (velikaš) in the service of Despot Stefan Lazarević (r. 1402–27), with the title of protovestijar (financial manager). He was the ktetor (donator) of Kalenić monastery, built in 1407–13. He is mentioned in 1426 alongside veliki vojvoda Radoslav, čelnik Radič and logotet Voihna. He had a brother, Petar. His wife was named Milica.

== See also ==
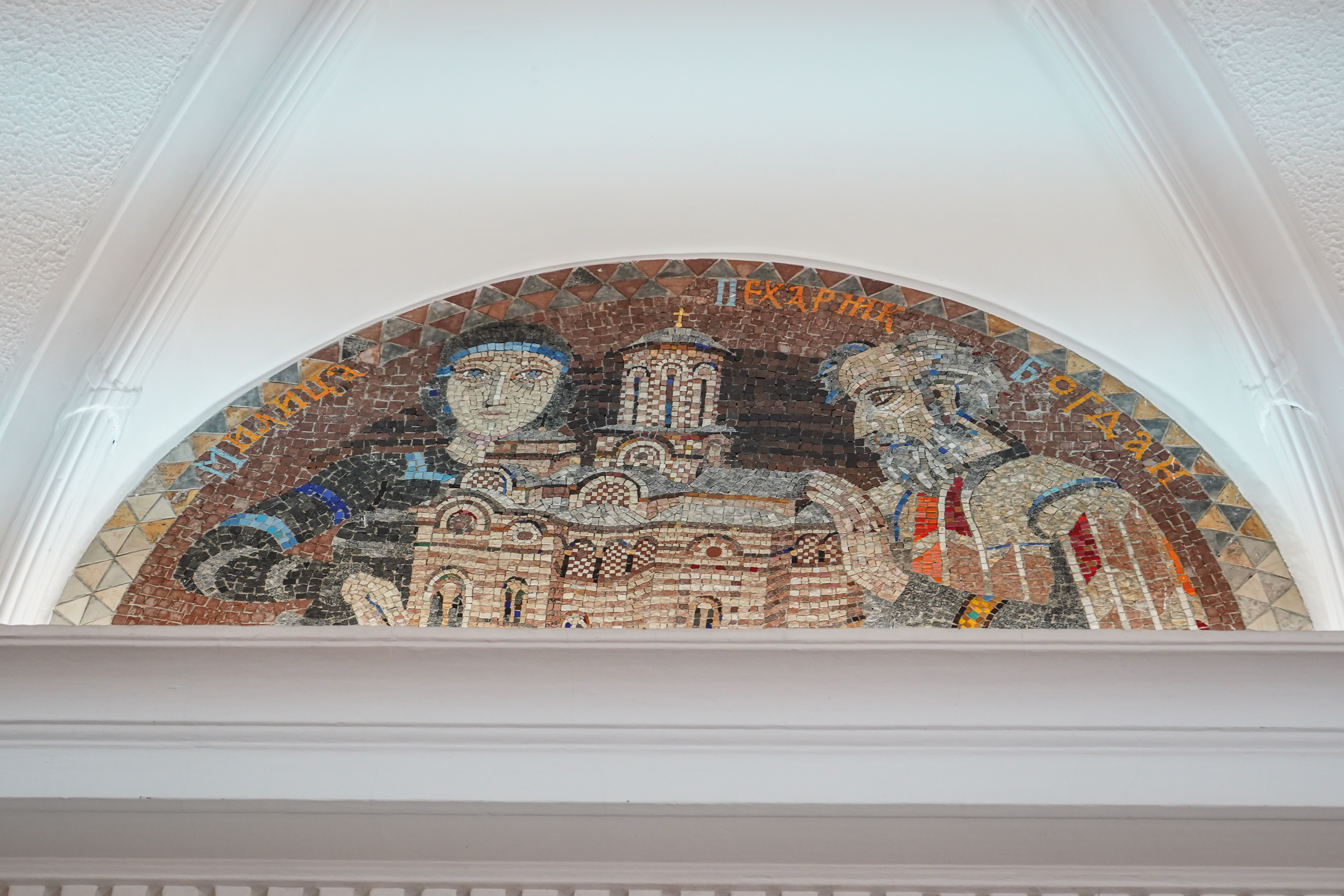
Milica and Bogdan as ktitors of Kalenić.

- Bogdan (d. 1252), Prince of Hum (fl. 1249)
- Bogdan (fl. 1363), kaznac in the service of Emperor Uroš V
- Bogdan Kirizmić (fl. 1361–71), protovestijar in the service of King Vukašin
- Bogdan (fl. 1407), logothete in the service of Despot Stefan
- Bogdan, chancellor in the service of Despot Đurađ Branković
