= Brvenik Naselje =

- Village (Selo)
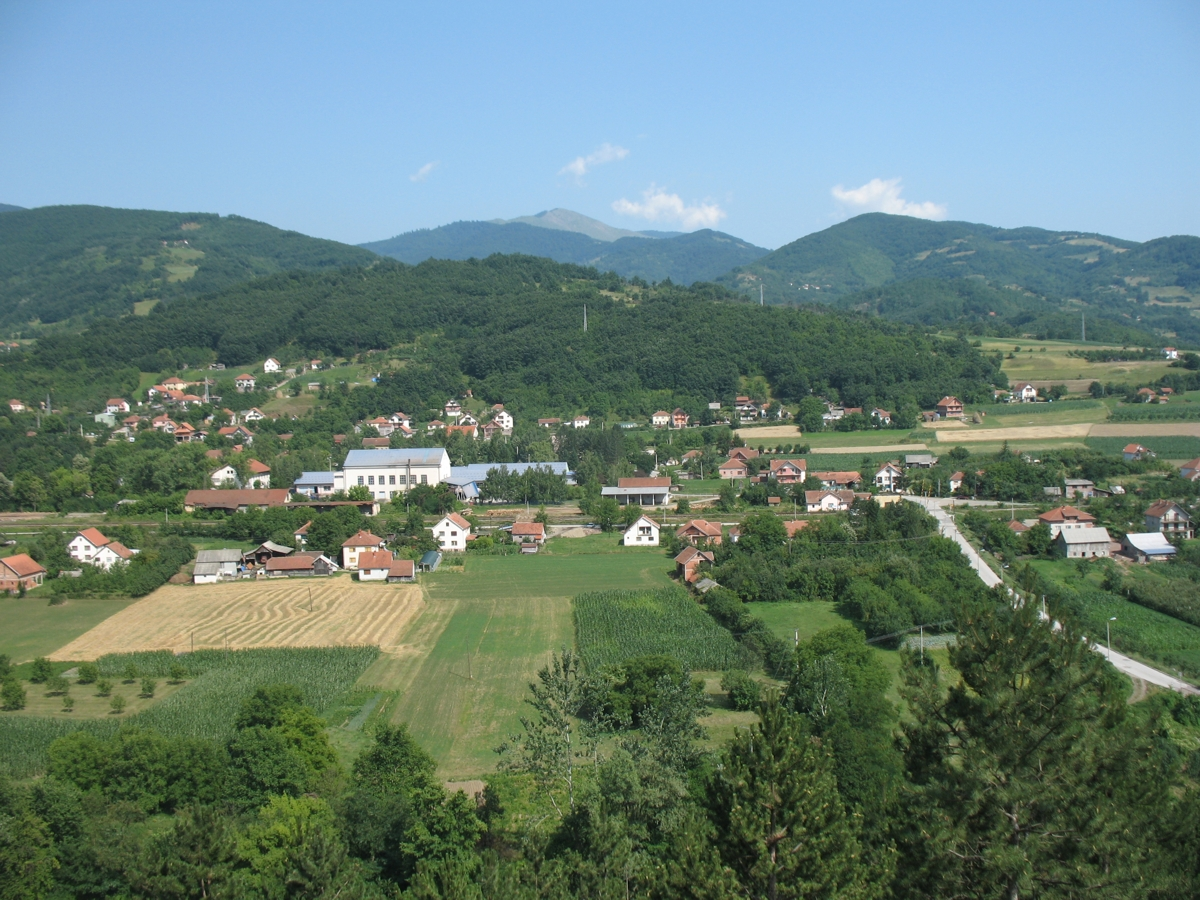
- View on Brvenik

- Location within Serbia
- Coordinates: 43°21′16″N 20°38′47″E
- Country: Serbia
- District: Raška District
- Municipality: Raška

Population (2002)
  - Total: 408
- Time zone: UTC+1 (CET)
  - Summer (DST): UTC+2 (CEST)

Brvenik Naselje is a village in the municipality of Raška, Serbia. According to the 2002 census, the village has a population of 408 people.

Medieval town of Brvenik was first mentioned in 1280. The remains of town walls are located on the hill above the village.

There are two medieval monasteries in the immediate vicinity of Brvenik, protected as cultural monuments of great importance. Stara Pavlica dates back from the era before Nemanjić dynasty, and was first mentioned in the 12th century. Nova Pavlica was founded by members of the Serbian noble Musić family in the 14th century.
