= Stefan Ratković =

Serbian nobleman 15c

- Grand Logothete (Велики Логотет)
- Reign: (fl. 1456–1459)
- Predecessor: Todor
- Successor: none
- Occupation: Nobleman

Stefan Ratković (Serbian Cyrillic: Стефан Ратковић; fl. 1456–59) was a Serbian nobleman and the last veliki logotet (Grand Logothete) of the Serbian Despotate. His court was in Draginovci, in the Lepenica region of Serbia, where he had his oldest estates. He was known to have already held the title of (standard) logotet in September 1456. He was elevated to the rank of the veliki logotet at the beginning of Despot Lazar Branković's (December 1456-January 1458) reign. He was loyal to Despot Lazar during the succession conflict between Lazar and his brother Stefan Branković on one side, and Grgur Branković, Mara Branković and Thomas Kantakouzenos on the other side. He also sided with Stefan Branković, Helena Palaiologina and their pro-Hungarian party during the plots of pro-Ottoman renegade Mihailo Anđelović in March 1458 which led to Anđelović's downfall and imprisonment. His holdings, which had already expanded during the last years of Despot Đurađ Branković, were further increased with lands all over the Despotate's territory during the reign of Despot Lazar and Despot Stefan as a reward for his loyalty to them and other services. However, they were all under the system of pronoia, in which a nobleman's ownership of his lands was conditional on providing military support to the state, as opposed to baština, the other form of land ownership in medieval Serbia, which was full and unconditional.

However, by 1459, Stefan Ratković, increasingly pessimistic about the greatly reduced and war-devastated Serbia's chances of repelling the ongoing Ottoman invasion, had a change of heart. Stefan Ratković assisted the plans of Helena Paleologina and King Stefan Tomaš, had a leading role in organizing Tomaš's son's marriage with late Despot Lazar's daughter Maria and the illegal seizure of power from Despot Stefan Branković that followed on 8 April 1459. He did this in exchange for a confirmation of his privileges, upgrading of his holdings to baština-status, as well as a grant of 100 houses in Bosnia to be used by him, his family and servants, and an allowance to leave the kingdom with his people and mobile property if and when he desires. When Stefan Tomašević betrayed the hopes of the Serbian Despotate by surrendering Smederevo without a fight, Ratković appears to have left for Bosnia with him.
