= Pavlica (Raška) =

- Village (Selo)
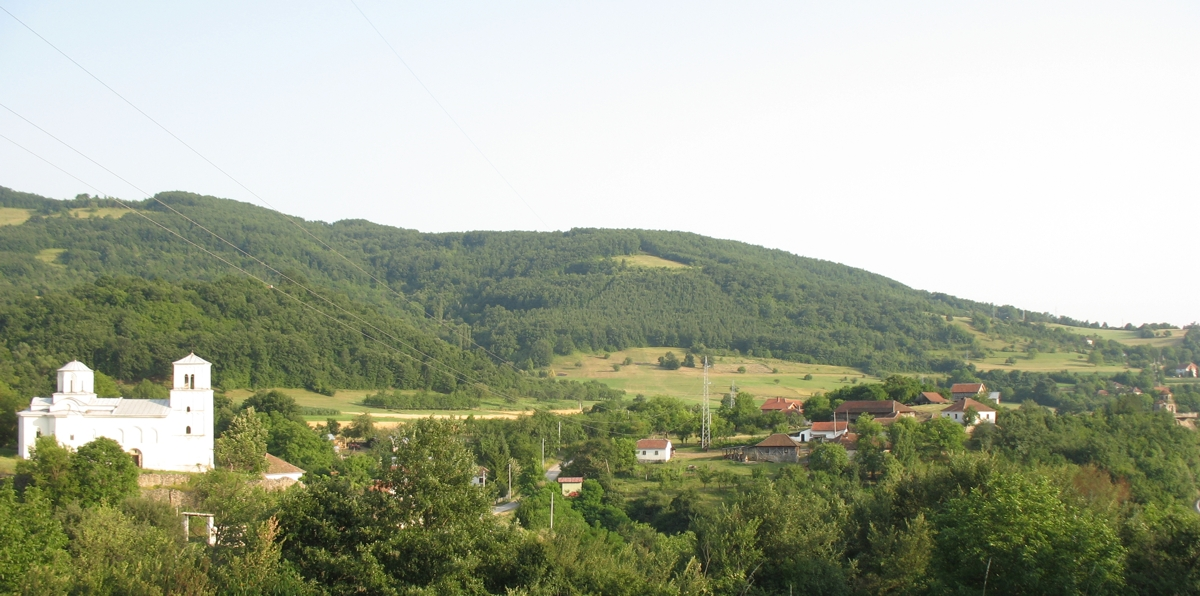
- View on Pavlica

- Location within Serbia
- Coordinates: 43°20′21″N 20°39′14″E
- Country: Serbia
- District: Raška District
- Municipality: Raška

Population (2002)
  - Total: 156
- Time zone: UTC+1 (CET)
  - Summer (DST): UTC+2 (CEST)

Pavlica (Serbian Cyrillic: Павлица) is a village in the municipality of Raška, Serbia. According to the 2002 census, the village has a population of 156 people.

There are two medieval monasteries in the village. Stara Pavlica dates back from the era before Nemanjić dynasty, and was first mentioned in the 12th century. Nova Pavlica was founded by members of the Serbian noble Musić family in the 14th century. They are both protected as cultural monuments of great importance.

== Notable people ==
- Savatije Milošević, Serbian hajduk and Chetnik commander
