= Nova Pavlica =

Monastery in southwestern Serbia

Coordinates: 43.3447°N 20.6494°E

- Манастир Нова Павлица
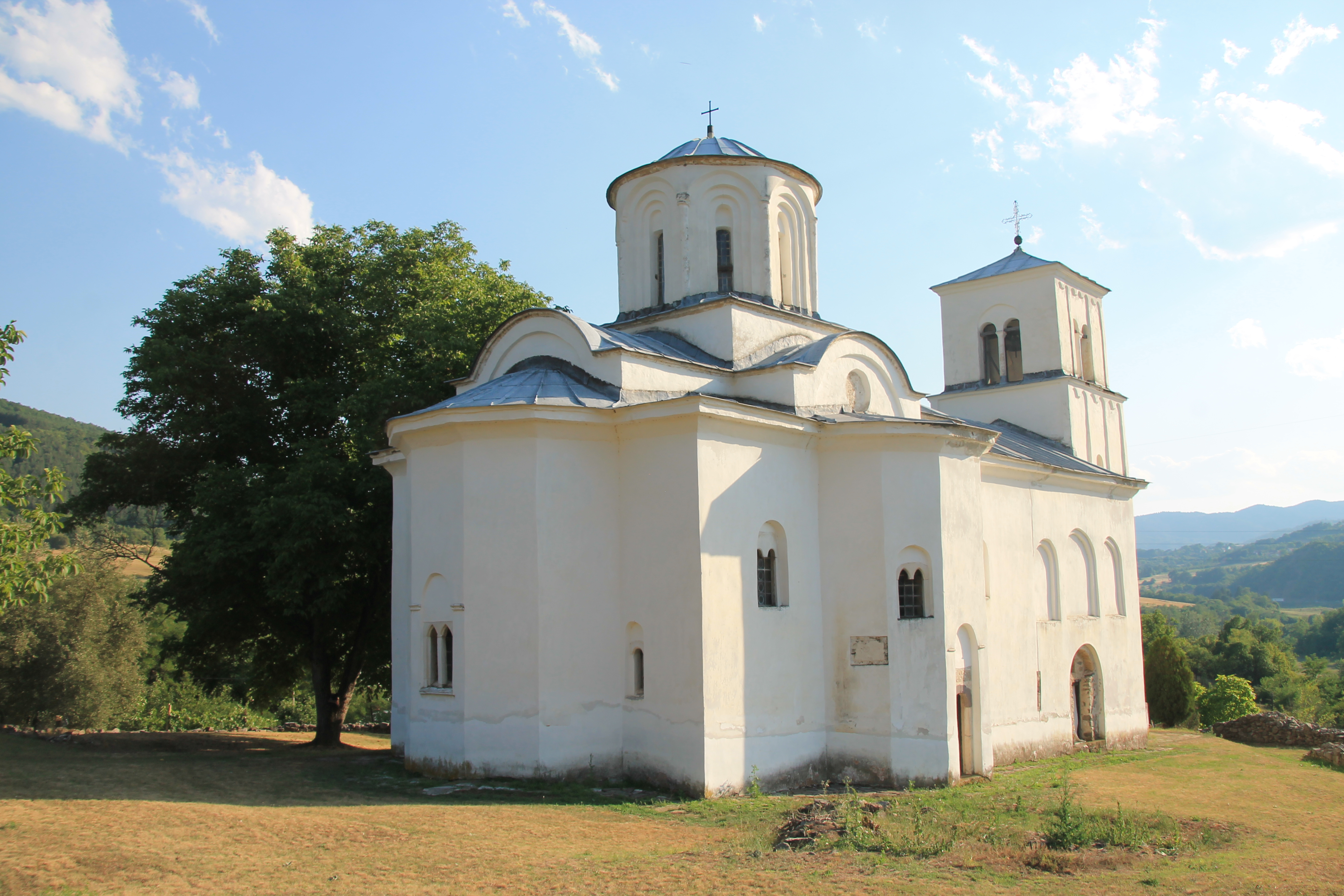
- Picture of Monastery in 2011
- Interactive map of Nova Pavlica

Monastery information
- Order: Serbian Orthodox
- Established: between 1381 and 1388
- Dedication: Presentation of Mary

People
- Founders: Stefan and Lazar Musić

Architecture
- Status: Eparchy of Žiča

Site
- Location: Pavlica, Raška, in southwestern Serbia

The Nova Pavlica Monastery (Serbian: Манастир Нова Павлица, romanized: Manastir Nova Pavlica) is a 14th-century Serbian Orthodox monastery located in Pavlica, Raška, in southwestern Serbia. It belongs to the Eparchy of Žiča. The monastery is located near Stara Pavlica, near river Ibar and near old town of Brvenik.

== Establishing ==
The monastery was founded by Stefan and Lazar Musić, members of Serbian noble Musić family. Their father was čelnik Musa and mother was Dragana Hrebeljanović, sister of Prince Lazar. The icons in church were painted in 1387. The monastery is dedicated to the Presentation of Mary. The monastery belongs to the Morava architectural school.

The building of Monastery was completed before the Battle of Kosovo, between 1381 and 1388. When relics of Prince Lazar were transferred to the Ravanica Monastery in 1390, they remained during one night in the Nova Pavlica Monastery.

== Reconstructions and early mentions ==
The church of the monastery was reconstructed and expanded in 1464 by Michael Angelović. The Ottoman defter of Brvenik kadilik probably mentions this monastery when it described it as New Church. In 1955 the façade of the church was repaired.

== Sources ==
- Subotin-Golubović, Tatǰana (1999). Српско рукописно наслеђе од 1557. године до средине XVII века [Serbian Manuscript Tradition from 1557 until the Middle of the Seventeenth Century]. Srpska Akademija Nauka i Umetnosti. ISBN 978-86-7025-282-0.
- Zirojević, Olga (1984). Crkve i manastiri na području Pećke patrijaršije do 1683. godine. Istorijski institut u Beogradu.
- Đurić, Srđan (1985). Ljubostinja, Crkva Uspenja Bogorodičinog. Prosveta.
