= Brvenik =

- Village (Selo)
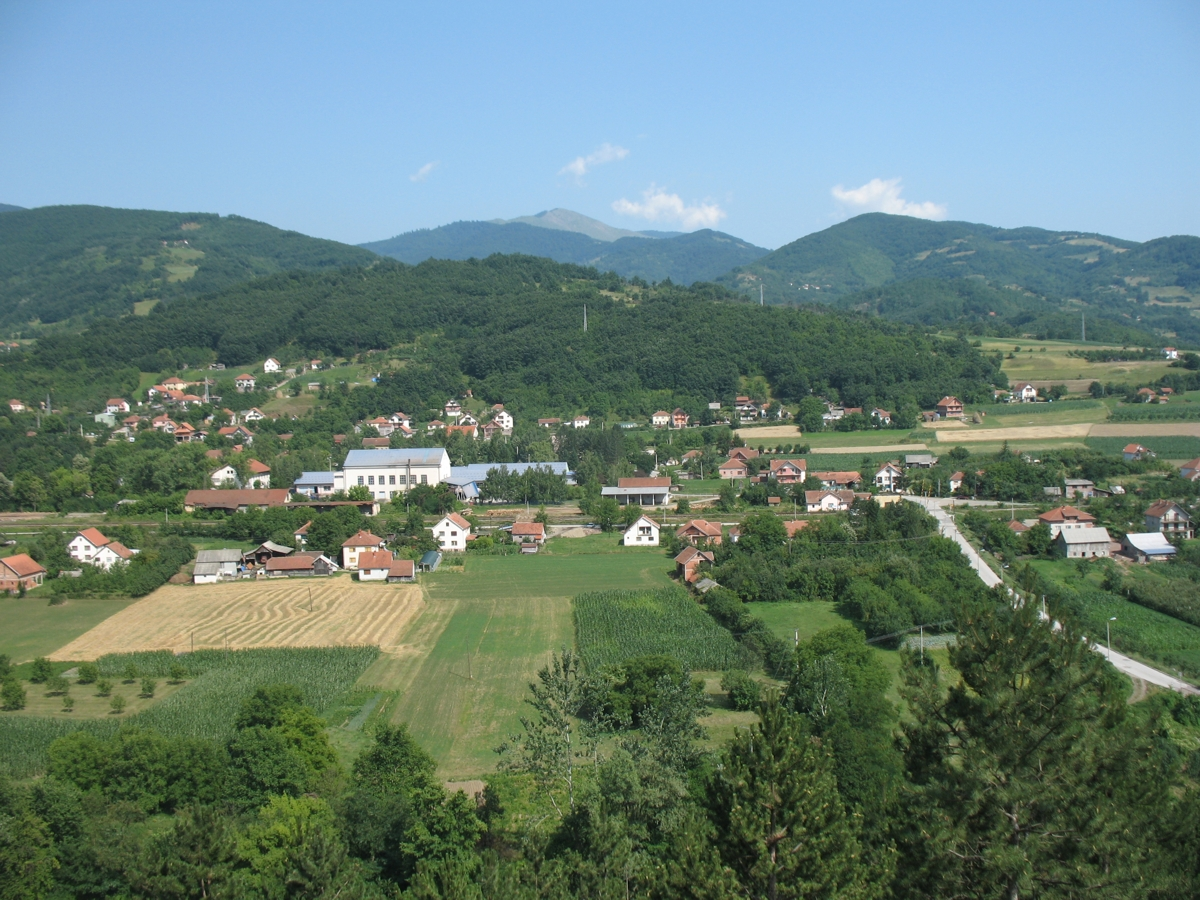
- View on Brvenik

- Location within Serbia
- Coordinates: 43°21′N 20°38′E
- Country: Serbia
- District: Raška District
- Municipality: Raška

Population (2002)
  - Total: 67
- Time zone: UTC+1 (CET)
  - Summer (DST): UTC+2 (CEST)

Brvenik is a village in the municipality of Raška, Serbia. According to the 2002 census, the village has a population of 67 people. The village has the remains of the medieval town and fortress of Brvenik.

There are two medieval monasteries in the immediate vicinity of Brvenik: Stara Pavlica and Nova Pavlica. They are both protected as cultural monuments of great importance.

== Fortress ==
The fortress of Brvenik is located on the hill (599m) overlooking the Brvenik village. The Brvenik župa (county) was mentioned in 1280. The county was exchanged between Serbian magnates Musa and Vojislav Vojinović in 1363, with Musa receiving Brvenik and Vojislav the Zvečan Fortress.
