= Bogdan (kaznac) =

- kaznac of the Serbian Empire
- Born: First half of the 14th century Serbian Kingdom
- Died: After 1363
- Issue: Nenad
- Occupation: Chamberlain

Bogdan (Serbian Cyrillic: Богдан; fl. 1363), was a kaznac (chamberlain) in the service of Serbian Emperor Uroš V (r. 1355–1371).

== Life ==
In 1354, A Bogdan, the son of noblewoman Višeslava was mentioned; this was either Bogdan Kirizmić or kaznac Bogdan. Bogdan, as a kaznac, was mentioned in a charter dating to July 15, 1363, which regulated the substitution of the župa (county) of Zvečan and the town of Brvenik, between knez Vojislav Vojinović and čelnik Musa. The document mentions that Bogdan held the village of Glušce in the Brvenik župa.

His son, Nenad, built the fortified town of Koprijan, during the rule of Prince Lazar, according to an inscription found in the Niš Fortress.
