= Radoslav Mihaljević =

Radoslav Mihaljević (Serbian Cyrillic: Радослав Михаљевић; fl. 1426–d. 1436) was a Serbian magnate (velikaš) in the service of Despots Stefan Lazarević (r. 1402–27) and Đurađ Branković (r. 1427–56), with the title of veliki vojvoda. He is mentioned in 1426 alongside čelnik Radič, protovestijar Bogdan and logotet Voihna. He is believed to have founded the ruined church in Radošin near Svilajnac during Despot Stefan's reign. He died in 1436.

== Additional sources ==
- Blagojević, Miloš (2001). Državna uprava u srpskim srednjovekovnim zemljama. Službeni list SRJ.
- Grupa autora (1982). Istorija srpskog naroda: Doba borbi za očuvanje i obnovu države 1371-1537. Srpska knjiiževna zadruga.
- Prilozi za književnost, jezik, istoriju i folklor. Rad. 1936.
- Miodrag Al Purković (1978). Knez i despot Stefan Lazarević. Sveti arhijerejski sinod Srpske pravoslavne crkve.

Military offices
Vacant Last known title holder: Uglješa Mrnjavčević	Serbian veliki vojvoda fl. 1426	Vacant Next known title holder: Mihailo Anđelović
