= Michael Angelović =

15th-century Serbian magnate

- Native name: Михаило Анђеловић

Michael Angelović (fl. 1451–73) (Serbian: Михаило Анђеловић) was a Serbian magnate, initially serving the Serbian Despotate with the titles of veliki čelnik and veliki vojvoda, and briefly part of the Serbian three-member regency in 1458. He plotted with the Ottomans but was apprehended and after brief captivity joined his brother, Ottoman official Mahmud Pasha, as a Timariot.

== Origin ==
After the Ottoman conquest of Thessaly in 1394, the ruling Angeloi Philanthropenoi family took refuge in Serbia. Michael and his brother (the later Mahmud Pasha) were grandchildren of either Alexios or Manuel. He may have also been related to the noblemen Alessio and Peter Spani through Alexios III Angelos, who was possibly their ancestor. According to Laonikos Chalkokondyles, his brother was captured by the horsemen of Sultan Murad II, while traveling with his Serbian mother from Novo Brdo to Smederevo. His brother was abducted as part of the devşirme practice, and became Mahmud, later rising to the highest ranks of the Ottoman Empire, becoming beylerbey (governor-general) of Rumelia in 1451 and Grand Vizier in 1455.

== Career ==
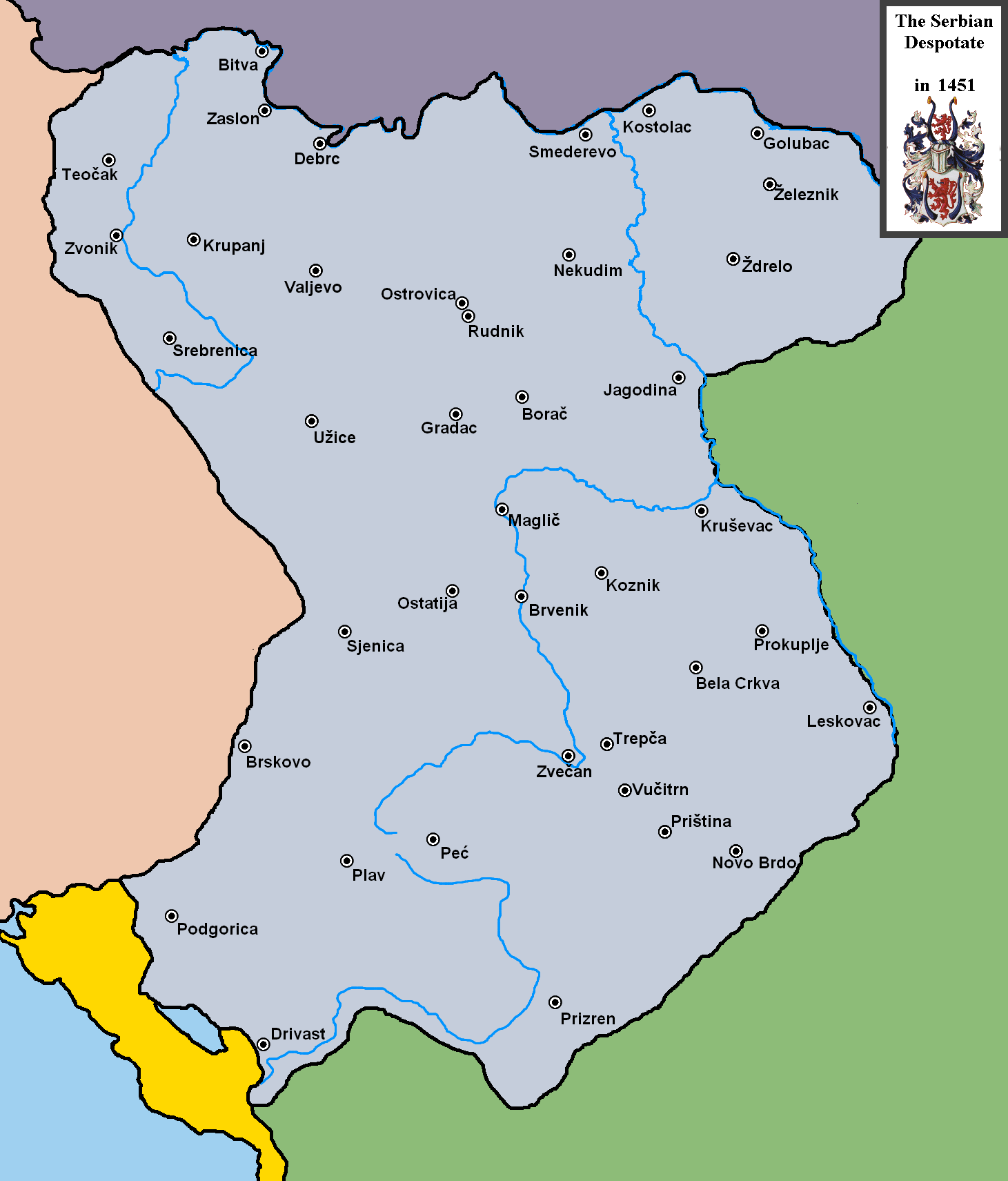
The Serbian Despotate in 1451.

Michael served as an official at the court of Serbian despots Đurađ (r. 1427–56) and Lazar Branković (r. 1456–58). In the negotiations between Despot Lazar and Mehmed II in January 1457, the two sides were represented by the brothers Michael and Mahmud. Owing to his personal talents, as well as his unique ability to positively steer negotiations with the Ottomans due to his brother's position, Michael rose in rank in the Serbian Despotate, from veliki čelnik in the 1440s to veliki vojvoda in 1456/7. Mentioned with the latter title in the beginning of 1457, he may have received it earlier. In 1453, Đurađ Golemović is mentioned with the title of čelnik, pointing to this conclusion. The advancement is reminiscent of that of Jovan Oliver, a magnate in the Serbian Empire.

Because Despot Lazar had no sons, after his death a three-member regency was formed, on February 3, 1458, of Michael, Lazar's widow Helena Palaiologina, and Lazar's blind brother Stefan. Michael was the leader, with the Serbian chronicle claiming that the other two ruled only through him. There was a secret struggle for the throne within the regency. Michael was supported by the Ottomans, and tried to become the new Despot of Serbia with their help. He began plotting behind the regency's back. After having secretly let a company of Ottoman soldiers into Smederevo, the population turned against him. The Ottoman company was captured or killed, and Michael was ousted from rule, captured and imprisoned on 31 March 1458, then transferred to Hungary. Unlike him, čelnik Đurađ and his brother Oliver stayed loyal to the Branković. Stefan Branković became Despot of Serbia in his own right and ruled alongside Helena Palaiologina for the next twelve months.

Michael was soon entrusted as a captive to Damjan Đurđević, a Ragusan servant of the Despotate. At some point after November 1458, he managed to free himself from Đurđević. He soon joined up with his brother and was granted a timar in the Ottoman Empire. By 1464, he had returned to Serbia, evident in the ktetor inscription of the monastery of Nova Pavlica, the endowment of the 14th-century Musić noble family. He financed the restoration of the monastery.

== Legacy ==
Later, Michael and Mahmud's Byzantine-Serbian descent and blood relations were important for the future establishment of Islamic rule in the Balkans and Anatolia. The use of kuls of Christian origin in high positions of the Ottoman court minimized the risks that they had to face in conquering and assimilating large Christian territories and populations.

== Annotations ==
1. In Serbian, his name is written Mihailo Anđelović (Михаило Анђеловић). In English-language scholarship, his name is written as Michael Angelović.

== Sources ==
- Babinger, Franz (1992) [1978]. Mehmed the Conqueror and His Time. Bollingen Series 96. Translated from the German by Ralph Manheim. Edited, with a preface, by William C. Hickman (1992 ed.). Princeton, New Jersey: Princeton University Press. ISBN 0-691-09900-6.
- Blagojević, Miloš (2001). Državna uprava u srpskim srednjovekovnim zemljama. Službeni list SRJ. ISBN 9788635504971.
- Grupa autora (1982). Istorija srpskog naroda: Doba borbi za očuvanje i obnovu države 1371-1537. Srpska knjiiževna zadruga. pp. 229, 304, 306–8.
- Krstić, Aleksandar (2015). "Прилог биографији великог војводе Михаила Анђеловића" [A contribution to the biography of Great Voivode Mihailo Angelović]. Zbornik radova Vizantološkog instituta. 52 (52): 359–379. doi:10.2298/ZRVI1552359K.
- Pajović, Milivoje (2001). Vladari srpskih zemalja. Gramatik.
- Petrović, Radomir (1983). "Откриће у Новој Павлици" (PDF). Saopštenje. XV.
- Spremić, Momčilo (2013). "Деспот Лазар Бранковић" [Despot Lazar Branković]. Zbornik radova Vizantološkog instituta. 50 (2): 899–912. doi:10.2298/ZRVI1350899S.
- Stavrides, Théoharis (2001). The Sultan of vezirs: the life and times of the Ottoman Grand Vezir Mahmud Pasha Angelovic (1453–1474). Brill. ISBN 978-90-04-12106-5.
- Veselinović, Andrija (2006). Држава српских деспота. Завод за уџбенике и наставна средства. ISBN 978-86-17-12911-6.
