= Banática =

Coordinates: 38.676°N 9.204°W

Banática is a small town at Almada, Portugal. Its name may derive from the Arabic language word for prince. It is the first port at the Tejo. It has a Repsol oil refinery, a sports club, Clube Recreativo e Desportivo de Banática, and a coast control unit of the Portuguese Republican National Guard.
