= Brvenica (Raška) =

Coordinates: 43.3564°N 20.6042°E

- Village (Selo)
- Interactive map of Brvenica
- Country: Serbia
- District: Raška District
- Municipality: Raška

Population (2002)
  - Total: 298
- Time zone: UTC+1 (CET)
  - Summer (DST): UTC+2 (CEST)

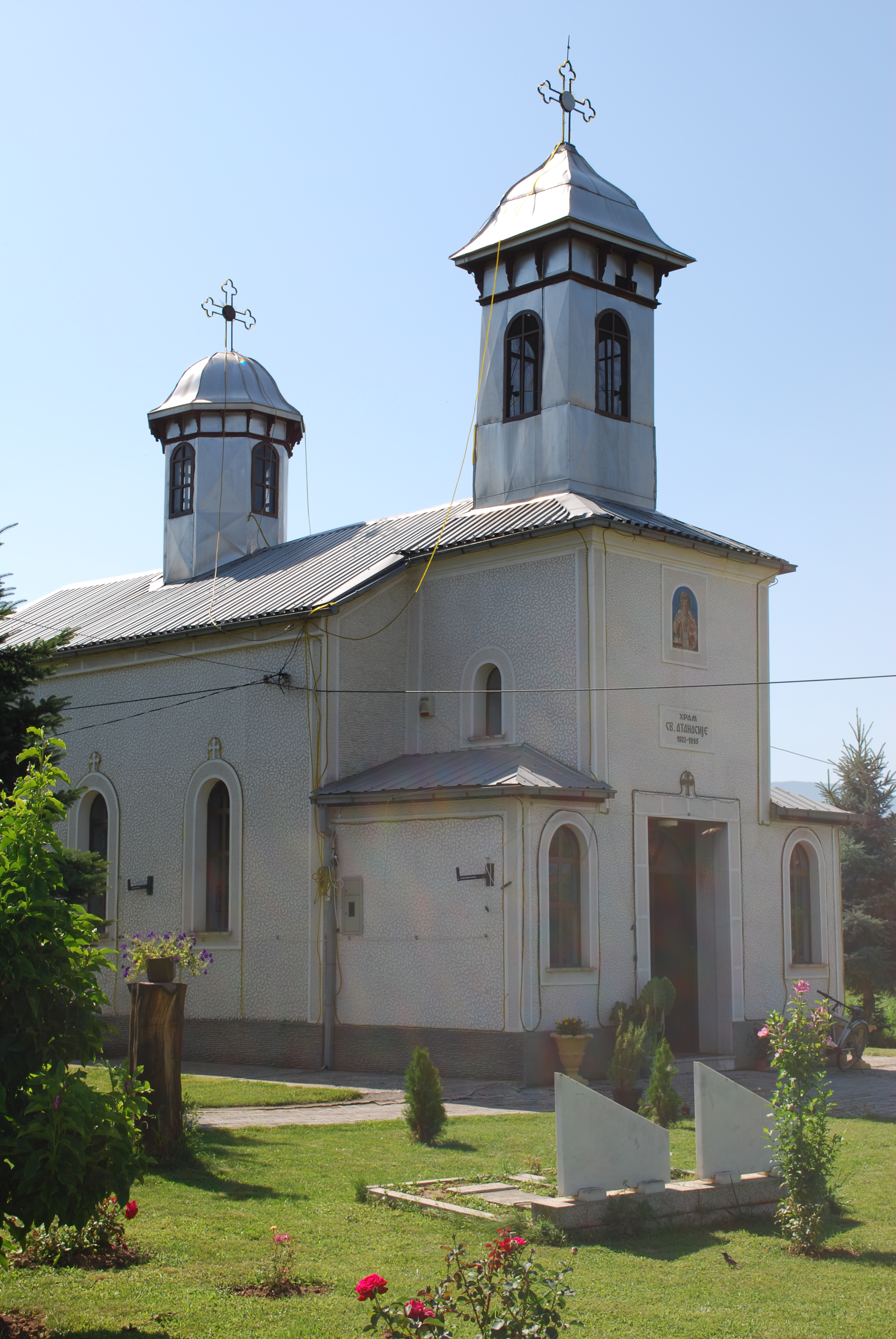
Sv. Atanasij in Brvenica

Brvenica is a village in the municipality of Raška, Serbia. According to the 2002 census, the village has a population of 298 people.
