= Veliki vojvoda =

Balkan military title

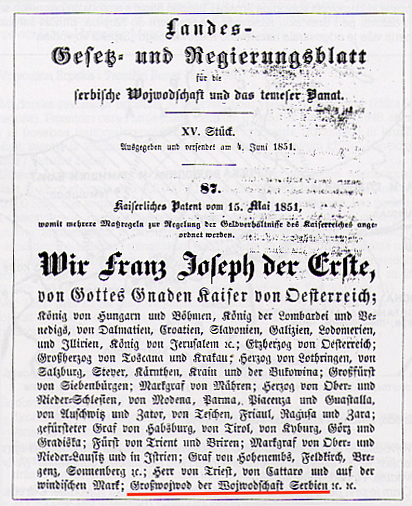
Veliki Vojvoda

Veliki vojvoda (Serbian Cyrillic: велики војвода; from veliki = great and vojvoda = duke) was a Serbian military and noble title in use during the Middle Ages and the Modern period. It is often translated into "grand duke".

== Middle Ages ==
Veliki vojvoda was a title used in Serbia in the Middle Ages and the Kingdom of Bosnia.

=== Serbia ===
It signified superiority over the other vojvodas. The title-holder commanded the army on occasions when the monarch did not attend in military campaigns, usually with lesser important military operations inside the country, or when a detachment was sent to aid allies. Another term used for the title was "standard-bearer" (stegonoša, Latin: vexillarius).

- Novak Grebostrek (fl. 1312), served Stefan Milutin
- Hrelja (fl. 1320s–31), served Stefan Dečanski
- Gradislav Borilović (fl. 1333), served Stefan Dušan
- Jovan Oliver (fl. 1341–55), served Stefan Dušan
- Nikola Stanjević (fl. 1355–66), served Stefan Dušan and/or Stefan Uroš V
- Uglješa Mrnjavčević (fl. 1358), served Stefan Uroš V
- Radoslav Mihaljević (fl. 1426–d. 1436), served Stefan Lazarević
- Mihailo Anđelović (fl. 1456–58), served Lazar Branković

There are also mentions of the title-holders in Serbian epic poetry regarding the Battle of Kosovo, such as Dimitrije.

== Modern period ==
=== Montenegro ===
The title was adopted in the Prince-Bishopric of Montenegro. Mirko Petrović-Njegoš bore the title, as "Grand Duke of Grahovo".

=== Vojvodina ===
The Grand title of the emperor of Austria included "Grand Voivode of the Voivodeship of Serbia" originating during the Serb uprising of 1848–1849.

== See also ==
- velikaš (magnate)
- veliki čelnik
- veliki župan
- veliki kaznac

== Sources ==
- Blagojević, Miloš (2001). Državna uprava u srpskim srednjovekovnim zemljama. Službeni list SRJ. ISBN 9788635504971.
- Etnografski institut (1958). Glasnik Etnografskog instituta. Vol. 7–15.
- Ćirković, Sima; Mihaljčić, Rade (1999). Раде Михальчић (ed.). Лексикон српског средњег века (in Serbian). Knowledge. ISBN 9788683233014.
- Purković, Miodrag (1985). Srpska kultura srednjega veka. Izd. Srpske pravoslavne eparhije za zapadnu Evropu.
