= Bogdan Kirizmić =

- protovestijar of the Serbian Empire
- Born: First half of the 14th century Serbian Kingdom
- Died: After 1371
- Noble family: Kirizmić
- Father: Rajko Kirizmić
- Occupation: Financial manager

Bogdan Kirizmić (Serbian Cyrillic: Богдан Киризмић; fl. 1358–71), was a Serbian nobleman, merchant from Prizren, protovestijar (financial manager) in the service of King Vukašin (co-ruled Serbia 1365–71, alongside Emperor Stefan Uroš V).

== Life ==
Kirizmić was from Prizren, the son of Rajko Kirizmić. In 1354, a Bogdan, the son of noblewoman Višeslava was mentioned; this was either Bogdan Kirizmić or kaznac Bogdan (fl. 1363).

Kirizmić was first mentioned in Ragusan documents in 1358, as a merchant in Prizren. At the end of July 1361, the emissaries of Emperor Uroš V, Kirizmić and a Marko (possibly Marko Mrnjavčević), arrived at Ragusa (Dubrovnik).

He was the richest merchant in Serbia, and became the protovestijar of King Vukašin (mentioned with the title on June 10, 1371). Although mentioned in Ragusan documents as the protovestijar of Vukašin, he would at the same time serve as the protovestijar of Emperor Uroš V.
