= Musić noble family =

Serbian aristocratic family

Musić Мусић
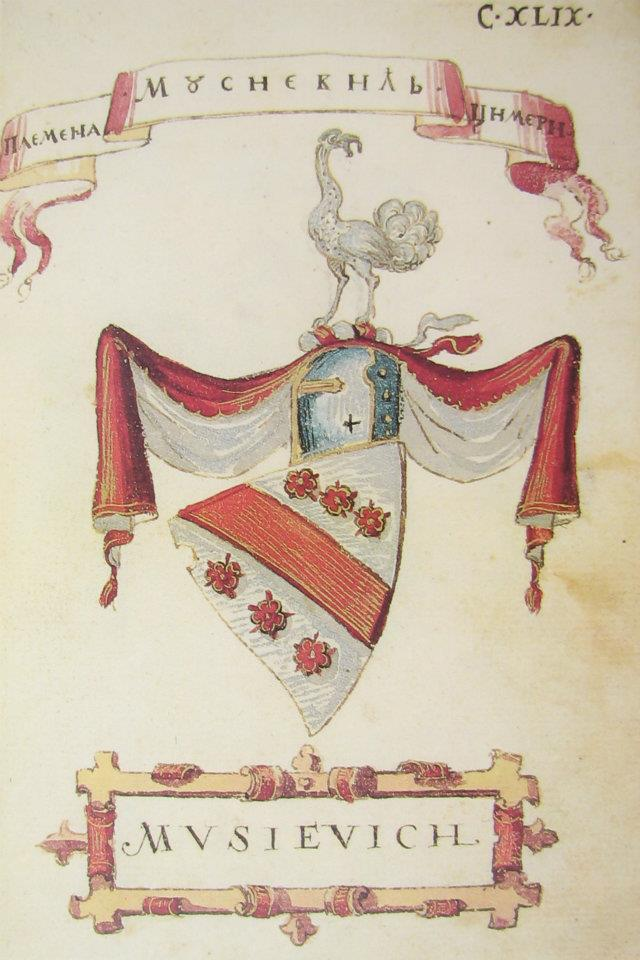
- Country: Serbian Empire and Moravian Serbia
- Founded: before 1355
- Titles: čelnik (Head)
- Estates: North Kosovo: Zvečan (1st); Brvenik (2nd)
- Dissolution: 1389 (Battle of Kosovo)

The Musić family (Serbian Cyrillic: Мусић, pl. Musići / Мусићи) was a Serbian noble house that served the Serbian Empire (1345–1371), and during its fall (1371–1389) it served Knez Lazar's Serbia. The eponymous founder was čelnik Musa, who married Dragana Hrebeljanović, the sister of Tsar Lazar (r. 1371-1389). Stefan and Lazar Musić, the sons of Musa, held a region of roughly modern Raška municipality and north Kosovo. The brothers died fighting the Ottoman Empire in the Battle of Kosovo (1389).

== History ==
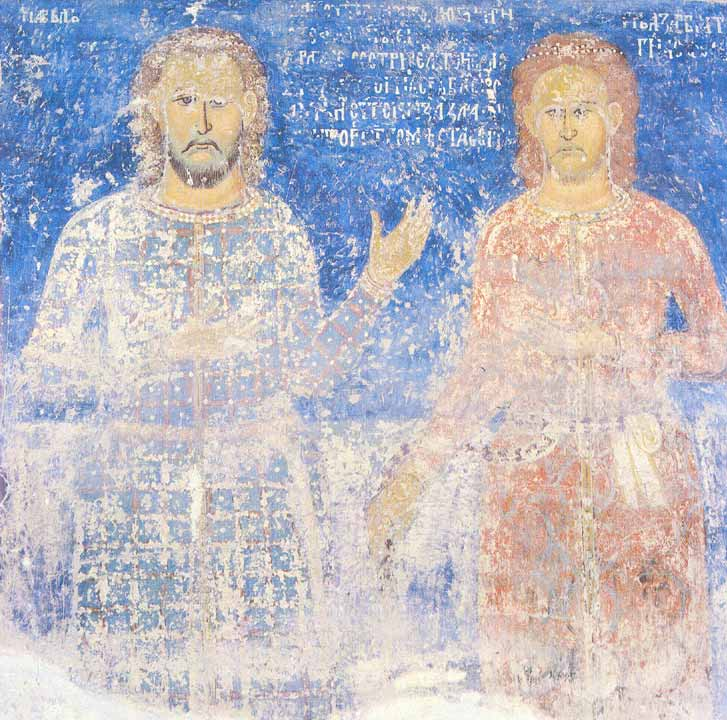
Ktetor portrait of the Musići, Nova Pavlica monastery, Serbia. (second half of the 14th century).

They held a region of north Kosovo, around Ibar with the seat in Zvečan. Musa was given the estate by Emperor Stefan Uroš V (r. 1355-1371). They relocated their seat to Brvenik on the Ibar, due to the swapping of fortified cities with Vojislav Vojinović (around 1355-1363). Their province included the Kopaonik area (with mines), in the middle of the Ibar and Lab, and stretched from the Radočelo and Brvenička župa in the northwest, to the Brvenica tributary of Lab in the southeast.

They supported the politics of Prince Lazar Hrebeljanović (r. 1371–89), and participated in the war against veliki župan Nikola Altomanović (1366–73), whom Stefan Musić directly ordered to be blinded in Užice, and thus left the political war during the fall of the Empire.

The Musić brothers founded the Nova Pavlica monastery, built after the Stara Pavlica, near Brvenik (Ibar). The ktitor inscription is preserved. At the request of their mother Dragana, the sister of Lazar Hrebeljanović, the monastery became a nunnery, in which Dragana spent the end of her life as nun. The two Musić brothers fell in the Battle of Kosovo (1389), and were buried in Nova Pavlica.

== Members ==
- Musa, čelnik under Emperor Stephen Uroš V (1355–1371)
  - Stefan Musić (d. 1389)
  - Lazar Musić (d. 1389)
  - Jovan Musić
