= Musa (magnate) =

- čelnik
- Successor: Stefan Musić
- Native name: Мльса
- Born: around 1330
- Died: before 1388
- Noble family: Musić
- Spouses: Dragana Hrebeljanović, sister of Prince Lazar

Musa (Serbian Cyrillic: Муса, Moses; fl. 1363–81) was a Serbian nobleman who served Emperor Stefan Uroš V (r. 1355–1371), with the title of čelnik. Musa married Dragana Lazarevic, the sister of Prince Lazar of Serbia. He is the founder of the Musić family, as father of Stefan, Lazar and Jovan. Jovan would later become the mytropolite of the Eparchy of Toplica.

The province governed by Musa stretched over the Kopaonik massif, between Ibar and Lab. Little is known about him. He is believed to have been born in ca. 1330 and married Dragana in 1355 at latest. First mentioned in 1363 when he was appointed as governor of Brvenik. Before 1363 Musa was governor of Zvečan. Musa was last mentioned in 1381, he died some time before 1388, when his son Stefan succeeded him.

== Sources ==
- Blagojević, Miloš (2001). Државна управа у српским средњовековним земљама [State administration in the Serb medieval lands]. Službeni list SRJ. ISBN 9788635504971.
- Ćirković, Sima; Mihaljčić, Rade (1999). Лексикон српског средњег века (in Serbian). Knowledge. ISBN 9788683233014.
- Šuica, Marko (2000). Немирно доба српског средњег века. Властела српских обласних господара. Službeni list SRJ. ISBN 978-86-355-0452-0.
- Mihaljčić, Rade (1975). Крај Српског царства [End of the Serbian Empire]. Belgrade: Srpska književna zadruga.
- Mihaljčić, Rade (1989). Крај Српског царства [End of the Serbian Empire] (2nd ed.). Belgrade: Beogradski izdavačko-grafički zavod.
