= Stara Pavlica =

Serbian Orthodox monastery

Coordinates: 43.3448°N 20.6497°E

- Стара Павлица
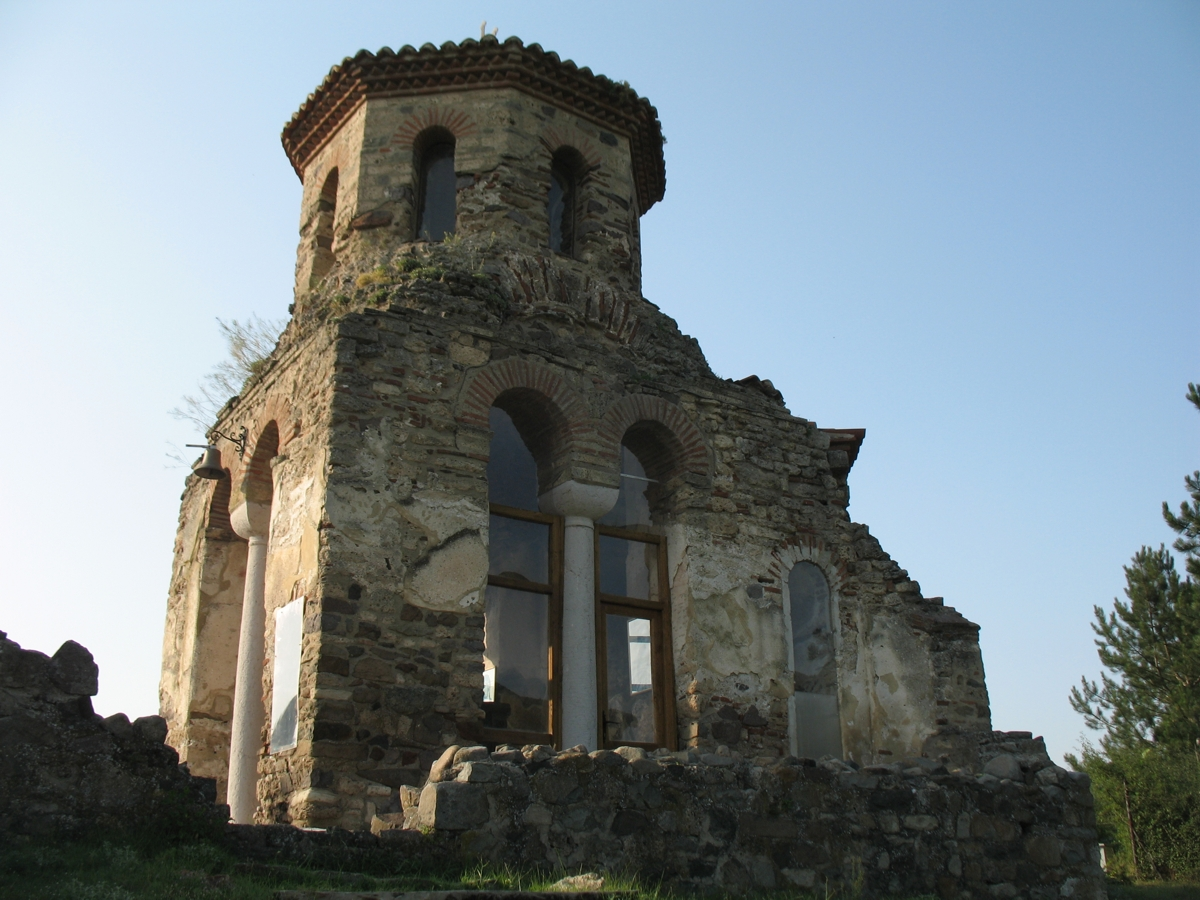

Religion
- Affiliation: Eastern Orthodoxy

Location
- Location: Pavlica
- Municipality: Raška
- Country: Serbia

Architecture
- Date established: 11th or 12th century

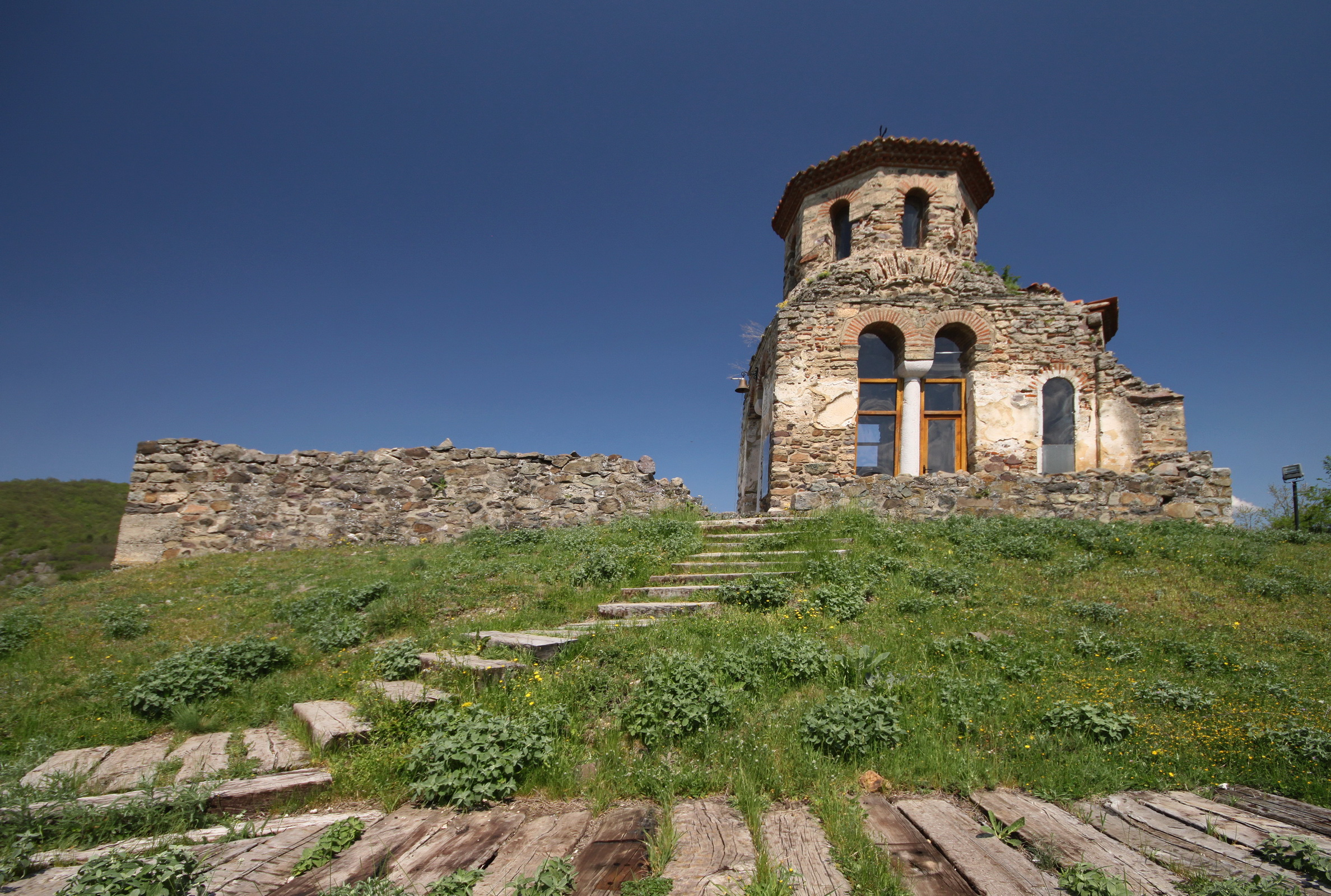
Stara Pavlica, July 2012.

The Stara Pavlica Monastery (Serbian: Манастир Стара Павлица, romanized: Manastir Stara Pavlica) is a medieval Serbian Orthodox monastery located in Pavlica, Raška, in south Serbia on a rocky plateau above the Ibar River, six kilometres north of the town of Raška.

It is believed to have originated in the pre-Nemanjić Dynasty at the end of the 11th century. The monastery is first mentioned in the charter of King Stefan the First Crowned, and parts of the church were restored during the 1970s. The monastery church is dedicated to the holy Apostles Peter and Paul.
