= Gabriele Trevisano =

15th-century Venetian commander

Gabriele Trevisano was a Venetian commander, who participated on the losing side of the Fall of Constantinople in 1453, having joined the Byzantine Empire in its defence of its capital city against the Ottoman Empire.

Alongside his fellow Venetian merchant-captain Alviso Diedo, he had anchored with his ships at the Golden Horn on a return voyage from the Black Sea, when the forces of Sultan Mehmed II laid siege to the city. The Venetians promised to remain in the city to fight - a total of six Venetian vessels and three from the Venetian colony of Crete were retained in the harbour with the consent of their commanders, now turned into warships. On 28 April a battle broke out between Venetian and Genoese vessels on one side and Turkish ships on the other. Trivisano's galley was sunk by Turkish cannon-fire, and abandoned. At other times the Venetians and their allies won some minor naval skirmishes against the Turks. During the siege, Trivisano also commanded a Byzantine garrison at the Maiden's Tower. Towards the end, Trivisano was captured by the Sultan's forces before he and his men could escape from the walls. According to Nicolò Barbaro's diary, he was released after payment of a ransom.
