= Castle of Ugento =

Fortified architectural complex in Italy

- Castello di Ugento
- Apulia, Ugento in Italy
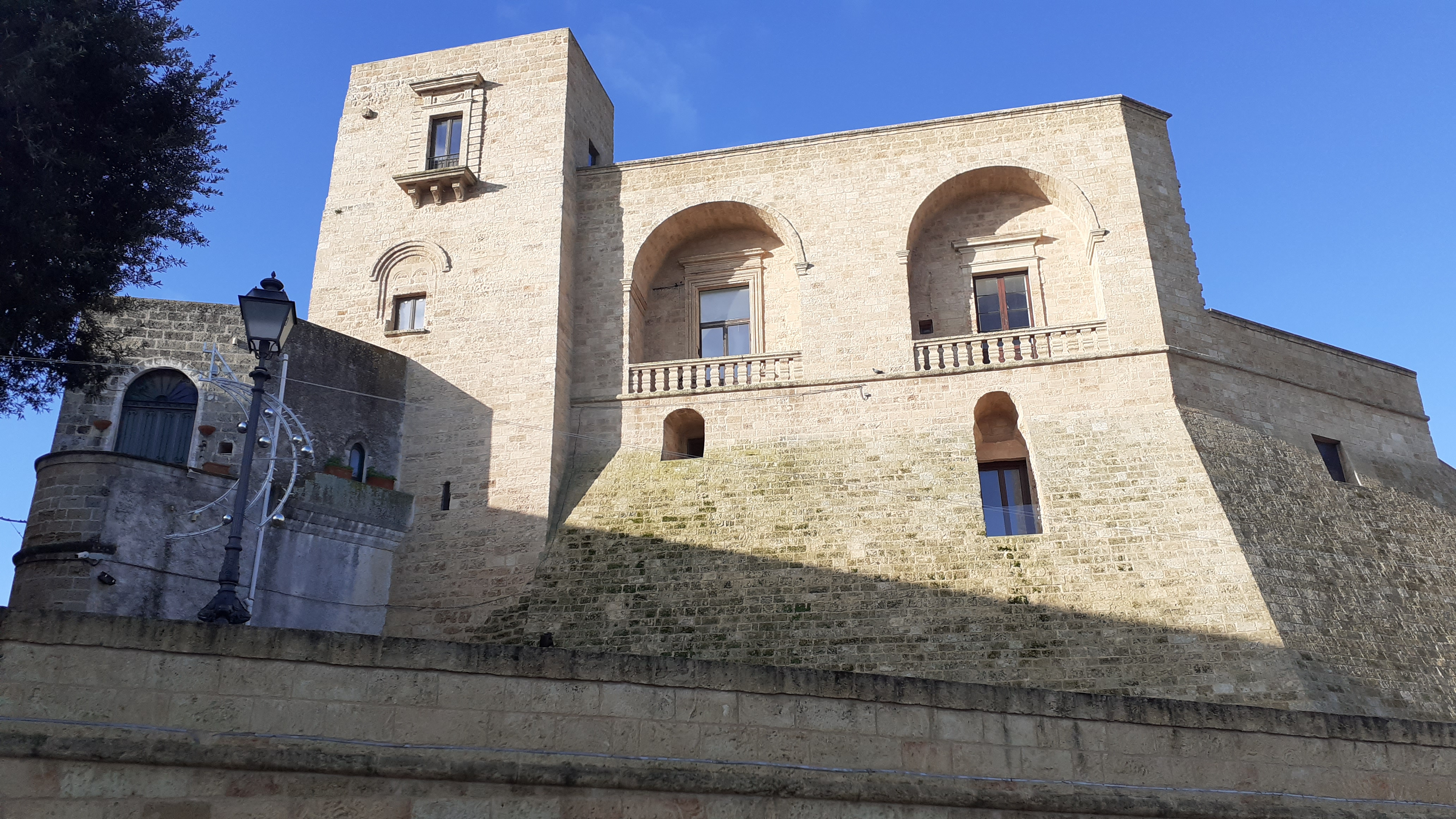
- The castle of Ugento

Site information
- Type: Medieval-Renaissance castle
- Owner: Municipality of Ugento
- Open to the public: Yes, through guided tours except on Mondays
- Condition: Restored between 2010 and 2020

Location
- Coordinates: 39.9295°N 18.1616°E

Site history
- Built: 11th century-17th century
- Events: 1537: the castle came under attack by the Turks

The Ugento Castle is a fortified architectural complex located in the municipality of Ugento in the province of Lecce.

== History ==
The castle stands on the highest point of the city. An initial layout of the building dates back to the late imperial phase, 3rd–4th century AD, subsequently modified and completed by the Normans at the end of the year 1000. It is precisely with the arrival of the Normans that Ugento was reborn; a Latin episcopal seat was established, and the castle took on the rank of a real fortress. In 1272, with the Angevin domination, the castle became royal, and Giovanni Conte was chosen as the first regent. Charles of Anjou was hosted in the castle in 1273. In 1275, the king decided to repair the manor by employing local labor, with the funds allocated for the royal castles. These works were only partially carried out due to insufficient financial resources which, however, were disbursed the following year. The building hosted many important families, including the Colonna, the Orsini del Balzo, and the Artus.

In 1537, following the occupation of the city by the Turks, the Castle was seriously damaged: two towers were destroyed as well as a good part of the western wing, the ground floor and the first floor. In 1564, Count Vincenzo Pandone resumed rebuilding the structure; the work was then continued in 1642 by Count Emmanuele Vaaz de Andrada. In 1643, the castle, together with the Ugentinian fiefdom, was purchased by the House of the Marquises of Love, who radically transformed the building. Although residing occasionally in Ugento, the marquises worked hard to make this residence sumptuous, adapting the ancient military structure to their needs and expanding the pre-existing factories with environments equipped with modern functionality and with new reception spaces, appropriately decorated with pictorial cycles of subjects mythological. The castle took on a new face: from a solid defensive structure to a sumptuous marquis residence. The promoters of these interventions in the two-year period 1694-1695 were the brothers Nicola and Francesco d'Amore who built, in the so-called "piano nobile", new and sumptuous reception rooms decorated with a cycle of frescoes inspired by Greek and Roman mythology and the Old Testament, enriched with anecdotes from the history of ancient Rome. These frescoes may have been conceived to celebrate the social affirmation of the two clients. Over the years, the Ugento Castle fell into a poor state of conservation, until 2013 when restoration work began which brought the structure back to its former glory.

== Architecture ==
The style used is late Baroque, a decorative style that affected all contexts of artistic expression and was the cornerstone of a period of reconstruction that transformed the architectural imprint of the area. The theme that runs through the decorative elements of the castle is centered on a play on words featuring the family surname (d'Amore) and the figures of Venus and Cupid, classical divinities of Love, as well as the matrimonial inheritance established by Pietro Giacomo, founder of the House, in order to prevent the dynasty from dying out and the property from being split up.

The iconography of the frescoes is based, especially in the so-called "Old Hall", on Ovid's Metamorphoses. These are parables that illustrate the benefit of contracting a good marriage and protecting the family heritage. In ihe family coat of arms, which we also find in one of the frescoed rooms, he is represented by a pelican who opens his chest with his beak to give his heart and entrails to his cubs. The three chicks rest on three mounds which represent the fiefdoms of Ugento, Ruffano and San Mango, of which the d'Amores were Marquises. Currently, a wing of the castle has been transformed into an elegant resort, while the ancient warehouses host an international school of Mediterranean and Salento cuisine.
