= Marco Barbaro =

Marco Barbaro (1511–1570) was a member of the Venetian noble Barbaro family, and the author of Genealogie Patrizie and other works in Venetian. His grandfather, Nicolò Barbaro wrote an account of the Fall of Constantinople.
