= Johannes Grant =

German engineer present at the Fall of Constantinople

Johannes Grant or Johannis Grandi was an army engineer and artillerist employed by the Byzantine Empire, who was present at the fall of Constantinople in 1453. He supervised wall repairs and helped prevent Ottoman mining of the fortifications.

Contemporary Greek and Latin accounts referred to him as being German, although Runciman has suggested he may actually have been a Scot named John Grant. He appears to have been affiliated with the Genoese contingent of mercenaries at the siege, possibly part of the men commanded by Giovanni Giustiniani. His use of counter-mining tunnels prevented the Turks from weakening or invading Constantinople from under the walls. He would fill barrels with water and observe the waves, using incendiary weapons, mostly Cheirosiphon to destroy Ottoman tunnels.

Grant took up the defense of Kaligaria Gate and its sector, alongside Theophilos Palaiologos. His fate remains unknown; he either perished in Constantinople or escaped to Chios with Giustiniani. However, if he was still posted at Kaligaria Gate when the city fell, he would not have had an opportunity to escape.

== Depictions in fiction ==
- Grant appears as a minor character in The Dark Angel by Mika Waltari
- John Le Grant, an Aberdonian based on the historical Johannes Grant, appears in The House of Niccolò by Dorothy Dunnett
- John Grant is the central character in the historical novel Porphyry and Ash
- John Grant is featured in the third episode of the historical docudrama series Rise of Empires: Ottoman; here he is depicted as Scottish.
- John Grant is the central character in the historical novel Master of Shadows by Neil Oliver
- In the EU4 mod The Third Odyssey (an Alternate history scenario in which the Byzantines flee to America before the fall of Constantinople) Johannes Grandt is an Austrian advisor who rediscovers the secret to Greek fire.
- In the Turkish TV series tr:Mehmed: Fetihler Sultanı, John Grant, a Scot, is portrayed by actor Abdül Süsler.
