= Nicolò Barbaro =

Venetian surgeon present at the Fall of Constantinople

Giornale dell’assedio di Costantinopoli 1453, Vienna 1856

Nicolò Barbaro, son of Marco, (1427–28 – c. 1521) was a Venetian nobleman and author of an eyewitness account, written in Venetian vernacular, documenting the Ottoman siege and conquest of Byzantine Constantinople in 1453, also known as the Fall of Constantinople.

His parents, Marco Barbaro from the sestierie of Santa Croce and Cristina Trevisan were married in 1417. Nicolò was the third of five sons and was registered for the Balla d’oro by his father in 1451.

In the summer of 1452, Nicolò Barbaro was chosen to serve as a crossbowman on the commercial galleys going to Constantinople. This convoy, under the command of Alvise Diedo, remained in Constantinople through the winter of 1452 and spring of 1453 to help in defending the city. Born in 1427 or 1428, Barbaro was not yet 25 years old when he became involved in the defense of Constantinople. He was related by blood to the captain of the mercantile convoy, Alvise Diedo, son of Marco, who is frequently mentioned in his account.

After his return from Constantinople, Nicolò Barbaro joined the Great Council of Venice in 1453. He became a member of the Giudici per tutte le Curie in 1457; one of the Ufficiali in Levante later that year; Treasurer of the Ufficiali al Cattaver in 1459; Capo Sestiere in 1464; and Podestà of Cittadella, near Padua, in early 1466. In 1470, Barbaro was elected to the Council of Forty. In 1476, he was elected to the Cinque alle Pace. He became one of the Signore di notte in 1478.

Nicolò Barbaro married Fantina Venier in 1484. They had two daughters, Cristina and Chiara, and son Marco, who was born in the early 1490s and died in 1511. Nicolò Barbaro's grandson, the son of Marco, was the genealogist Marco Barbaro.

== Diary of the Siege of Constantinople ==
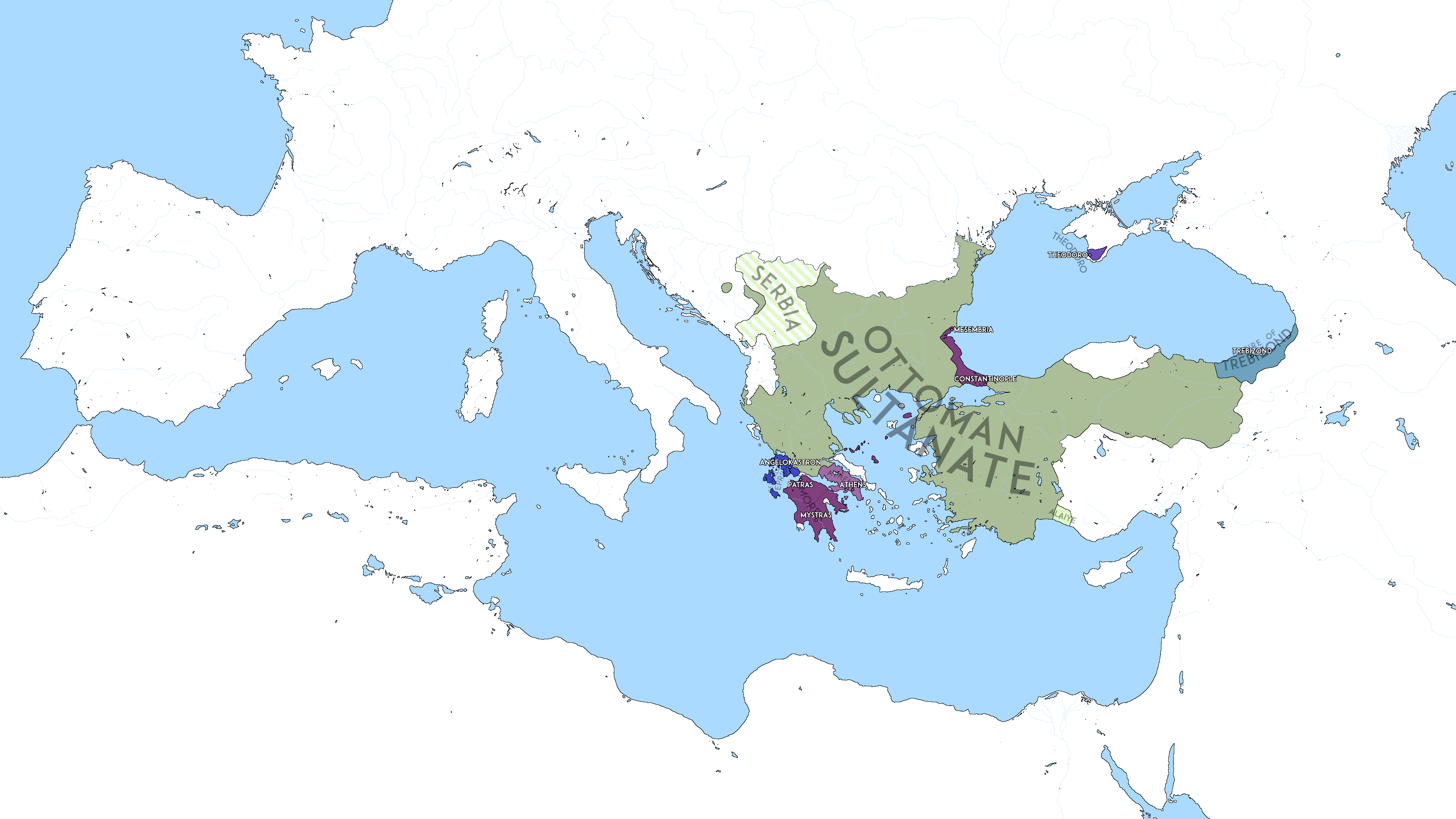
The Ottoman Sultanate and the Eastern Roman Empire in April 1453.

There are only two complete versions of Barbaro’s account, the 1856 edition by Enrico Cornet, and a revision by Alberto Codato, with a modern Italian translation, in 2017. Other editions and translations consist of selected passages only, and do not include the lists of names. In his account, Barbaro refers to himself as the medic of the galleys (“el miedego dele galie”), and is often referred to in scholarship as the ship’s doctor or physician. However, recent research suggests that he served as a crossbowman on the annual mercantile convoy to Constantinople that year, a role he is thought to have held on other convoys before and after 1453. It is unclear whether he performed both functions on the voyage to Constantinople, and the reason for his self-reference as a medic alone remains unknown, as his reconstructed curriculum vitae shows no indication of medical training or career.

Map of Constantinople and the dispositions of the defenders and the besiegers

Historian Steven Runciman described Barbaro as "the most useful of the Western sources" on the fall of the city, largely due to his detailed narrative that recounts the events of the siege on a daily basis. However, Barbaro’s Venetian background influenced his views, particularly his strong anti-Genoese sentiments, especially toward the Genoese of Pera (modern-day Galata), whom he accused of collaborating with the Ottomans during the siege. Barbaro also alleged that Zuan Zustignan, the Genoese commander stationed at the Mesoteichion (Μεσοτείχιον, "Middle Wall"), the weakest section of the Theodosian Walls, abandoned his post, leading to the city's fall:

"Zuan Zustignan, that Genoese of Genoa, decided to abandon his post and fled to his ship, which was lying at the boom. The Emperor [Constantine XI] had made this Zuan Zustignan captain of his forces, and as he fled, he went through the city crying 'The Turks have got into the city!' But he lied through his teeth, because the Turks were not yet inside."

Another eyewitness, Leonard of Chios, however, reported that Zustignan was injured by an arrow and secretly sought medical assistance. Greek historians Doukas and Laonikos Chalkokondyles similarly stated that Zustignan was injured, with only Barbaro claiming that the Genoese commander fled in this manner.

Despite these criticisms, Barbaro's account remains valuable for its detailed, day-by-day chronology of the siege events and for providing the names of over 100 Venetians who were in Constantinople at the time.

Barbaro is believed to have completed the initial writing of his narrative by 1472 but continued working on the manuscript for decades, updating it with information on Venetian noblemen present during the siege who had since died. Evidence suggests he stopped working on the manuscript sometime between 1503 and 1507. Barbaro may have been the last surviving Venetian nobleman involved in the 1453 defense, reportedly dying in 1521. Barbaro's account remained unpublished for over three hundred years, until it passed from descendants of his family to the Biblioteca Nazionale Marciana in 1837.
