= Orsini del Balzo =

Italian noble family

Coat of arms of the House of Orsini del Balzo

The House of Orsini del Balzo was an Italian noble family from the 13th and 14th centuries.

== History ==
The dynasty was founded with the marriage between Roberto from the Orsini family and Sveve del Balzo from the House of Baux. The family produced a Queen of Naples and held the principal title of Count of Soleto before it was confiscated by Pope Boniface IX.

== Family tree ==
	Raimondo "Raimondello" Orsini del Balzo * 1350-1355 circa † 1406; Prince of Taranto married in 1384 Maria d'Enghien
Giovanni Antonio "Giannantonio" * 1401 † 1463; Prince of Taranto married nel 1419 Anna Colonna	Maria * ? † ? Duchess consort of Atri married Antonio Acquaviva	Caterina * ? † ? Countess of Copertino married Tristan of Clermont	Gabriele * ? † 1453; Duke of Venosa married Giovanna Caracciolo
			Maria Donata * ? † 1485; Princess consort of Altamura married Pirro del Balzo	Raimondina * ? † 1490 circa Princess consort of Salerno married Roberto Sanseverino
