= Theophilos Palaiologos =

Byzantine noble (died 1453)

- Born: Unknown
- Died: 29 May 1453; Constantinople (modern-day Istanbul, Turkey)
- Dynasty: Palaiologos

Theophilos Palaiologos (Greek: Θεόφιλος Παλαιολόγος; died 1453) was the cousin of emperor Constantine XI Palaiologos, or was at the very least of the Palaiologos family. Theophilos commanded Byzantine troops during the Fall of Constantinople. Known as a grammarist, humanist, and mathematician, Leonard of Chios says of him that Theophilus was 'of noble linage and deep scholarship'. The Greek historian and near contemporary of the fall of Constantinople Laonikos Chalkokondyles describes in book eight of his Histories Theophilos 'fighting in a manly way to the end', choosing to die rather than see his country and family in captivity.
