= Ubertino Posculo =

Italian humanist

Posculo
- Born: Ubertino Posculo ca. 1430 AD Brescia, Italy
- Died: 1507/1508 AD (age 77–78) Brescia, Italy
- Occupation: Humanist, educator, poet
- Genre: epic, epideictic
- Relatives: Maffeo Posculo (Father)

Ubertino Posculo (c. 1430 – 1507), also spelled Ubertino Pusculo and Latinized as either Ubertinus Posculus or Ubertinus Pusculus, was an Italian humanist who was a student in Constantinople when the city was sacked in 1453 by the Ottoman army. Upon his return home, Posculo was the first to teach both Greek and Latin in Brescia.

== Life ==
Posculo was born in Brescia with family roots in nearby Bagnolo Mella. His father, Maffeo Posculo, was a notaio who had done well enough in his profession to afford Posculo's studies. Posculo most likely studied first under Tommaso Seneca da Camerino and later Gabriele da Concorezzo in Brescia, but while still an adolescent left for Ferrara to learn Greek from Guarino da Verona. It was here that Posculo determined to follow the same path that a number of other Italian humanists had taken (including Guarino da Verona) to perfect their Greek by studying in Constantinople for an extended period of time. Posculo chose to do this in 1452 and while there most likely continued his study of Greek with John Argyropoulos (marginalia in two manuscripts containing works by Posculo identify John Agyropoulos as Posculo's teacher in Constantinople). For a recent assessment of Argyopoulos and the milieu of scholars who taught alongside him, see Zorzi 2017/2018, 310-313.

It is unclear whether Posculo participated in the defense of Constantinople, but the detail he is able to provide in the Constantinopolis about the positions of the defenders suggests he may have been among those stationed along the walls. What is more certain is that after Constantinople fell, Posculo was taken prisoner, sold as a slave, and held in Pera, thus compelling him to secure ransom. After a year his ransom had been paid, but before he was even able to leave the Aegean Sea, Posculo was captured by pirates and nearly sold into slavery a second time on the island of Rhodes. Through the assistance of Hospitaller Knights, Posculo was able to escape and eventually return to Italy in 1455.

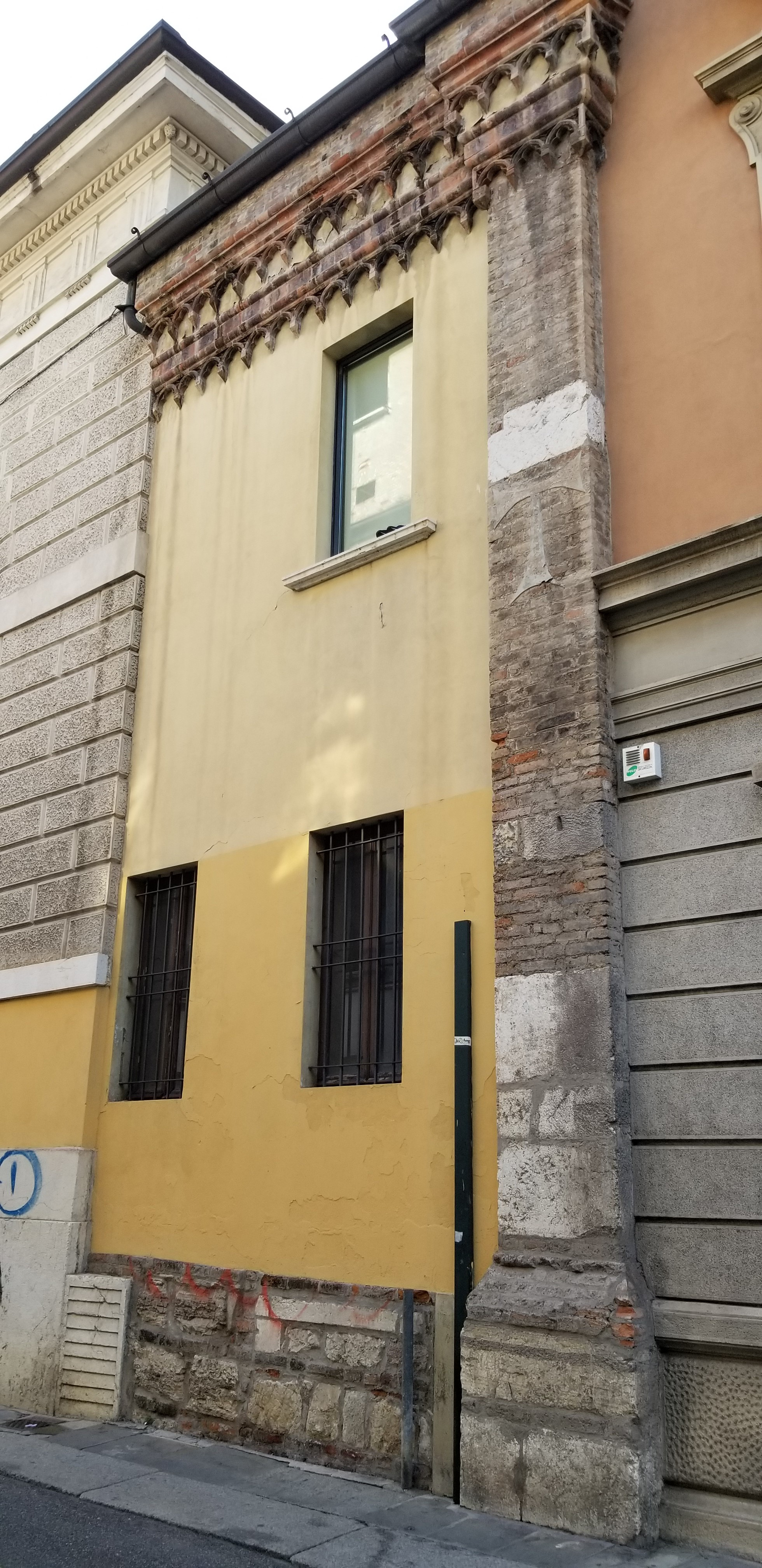
The entrance to Posculo's school is thought to be at Corso Giacomo Matteotti, 19 where a pillar bearing a Hospitaller cross (upper right in this picture) and architrave from the original structure stands enclosed within the edifice of the current building.

Brescia was not Posculo's first destination upon returning to Italy. Instead, he remained in Rome for three years under the patronage of Domenico Capranica and later under his brother Angelo Caprianica. In the meantime, he began composing the Constantinopolis and the De Laudibus Brixiae Oratio. Upon returning to Brescia in 1459, Posculo opened a school which bore the distinction of being the first to offer Greek in Brescia. He taught in this school until his death, and throughout this time continued to compose additional works, but quite likely never traveled beyond Brescia again. The family tomb inscription he commissioned with his brother still stands in the church of San Franceso where Posculo was buried.

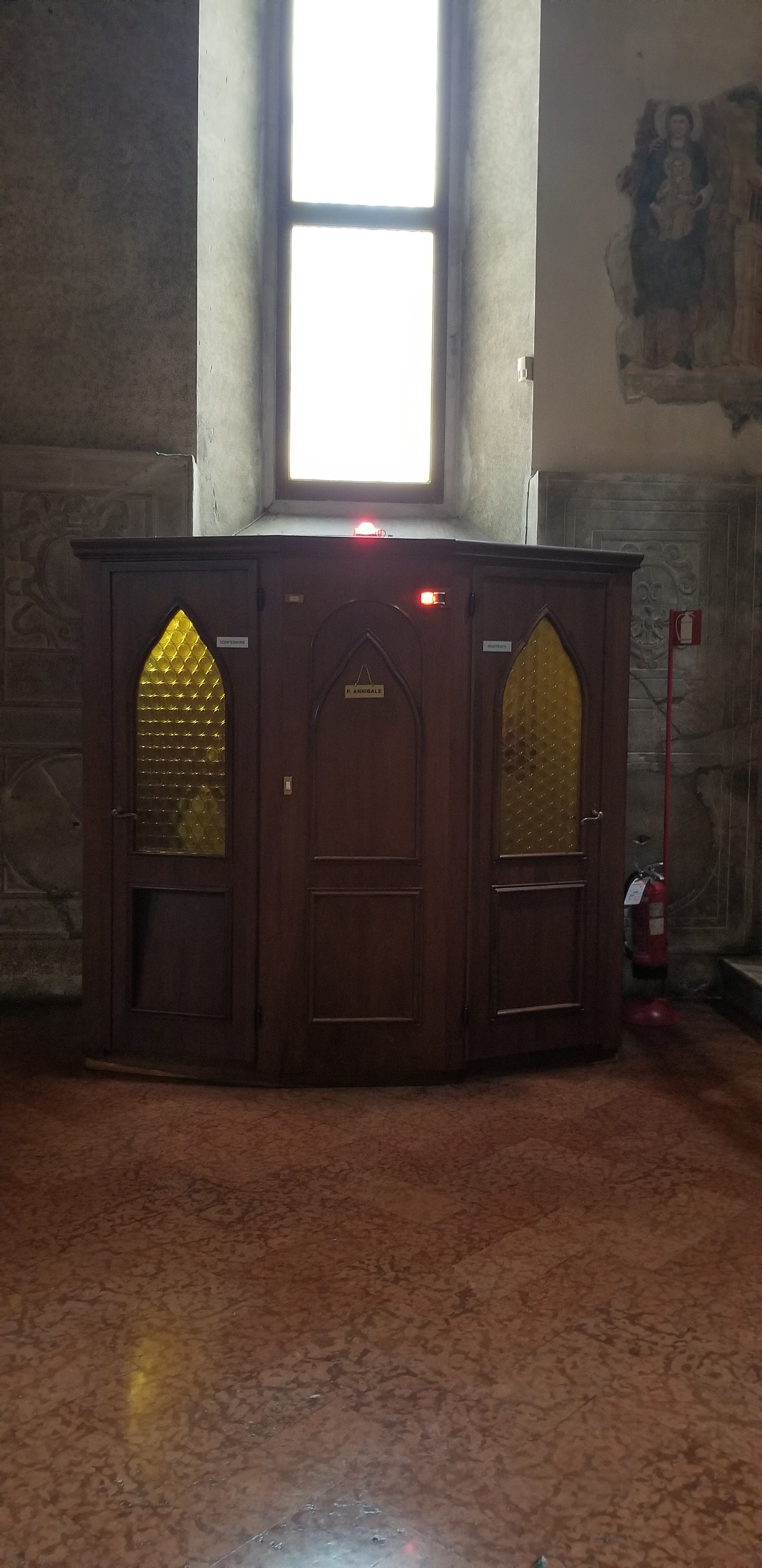
Posculo's funeral inscription is currently hidden by the confessional which is pictured here and situated immediately to the left of the public entrance to the church

He died as someone well known in his region for his skill in teaching Greek and Latin and was respected by contemporary humanists who knew him. A few epigrams in praise of Posculo have survived in a manuscript containing the Constantinopolis and the De Laudibus (Oxford Bodleian Canon. Class. lat. 120 55r), the first by Michele Carrara and the second by an individual who identifies himself only as “Magister G”:

Praise of Posculo by Michele Carrara

Dum lupus in mugilum nativa exarserit ira,
dum geret in folles odia tanta canis,
carmine clara tuo vivent monimenta Pelasgum,
nomina Ubertini tempora nulla terent.

"As long as the sea bass by nature burns with anger for the mullet
as long as the dog harbors great hatred for the ball,
the distinguished monuments of the Pelasgians will live on through your poem
the passage of time will not wear away the name of Ubertino."

Praise of Posculo by "Magister G"

Constantini urbis casus, quem, Poscule vates,
scripsisti egregie, vivet dum robora tellus,
dum coelum stellas, dum vehet amnis aquas.

"The fall of Constantinople, which you, O Posculo the prophet
wrote so marvelously, will live so long as the earth bears the oak,
so long as the sky the stars, so long as the river the waters."

Prose assessments by authors in generations proximal to Posculo's lifetime are similarly laudatory.

== Works ==
=== Ultima Visio Danielis Prophetae ===
A translation from the Greek original into Latin in the year 1454, most likely in the months immediately following his release from slavery under an unidentified Ottoman. A prefatory sentence in the one manuscript containing this work identifies the translation as ad verbum or “word for word.” The content of this brief work by Pseudo-Methodius of Patara presents an apocalyptic future closely linked to the destruction of Constantinople with special emphasis on the role that Muslim empires would play in bringing this about.

=== Constantinopolis ===
Composed between the time Posculo arrived in Rome in 1455 and completed at some point close to 1460. This Latin hexameter epic poem in four books with 3,007 verses recounts the events leading up to the fall of the city in books 1–2 followed by a description of the fall itself in books 3–4. The style is aspirationally Vergilian, but intertextual references to authors other than Vergil abound. In effect, this poem serves as Posculo's Iliad and it brought him notoriety in Brescia and the surrounding region in the 15th century. This poem has received considerable attention in recent years including a translation of Book 4 by Déroche with notes by Therry Ganchou in French (2012), a translation and historical commentary of Book 4 in Italian by Francesco Macinanti as an M.A. thesis (2017), and a translation and philological commentary of Book 4 in English by Bryan Whitchurch as a Ph.D. dissertation (2019).

=== De Laudibus Brixiae Oratio ===
Composed between the time Posculo arrived in Rome in 1455 and when he recited the speech before the Grand Council of Brescia on the occasion of his return home in 1459. If the Constantinopolis can count at Posculo's Iliad, the opening chapter of the De Laudibus (approximately 676 words) might be seen as Posculo's Odyssey. Beyond the opening chapter, the De Laudibus is an encomium in praise of Brescia and its citizens. To accomplish this, Posculo begins by praising the climate of the city, its ancient history, the fertility of the land, the activities of its inhabitants including their brave defense against the siege Milan laid upon the city when Posculo was roughly eight years old, the natural beauty of Brescia, and finally the virtues of its inhabitants not the least of which is their piety toward God. This speech has garnered considerable attention from scholars in Brescia, most significantly in the work of Valseriati 2009.

=== Symonidos ===
Composed shortly after the death of two year old Simon of Trent in 1475, whose death served as the catalyst for a vicious initiative headed by Johannes Hinderbach to hold the Jews of the city accountable. It is a two book hexametrical poem in hagiographic style on the life, martyrdom, and miracles brought about by Simon of Trent. The work continued to see revisions and additions in the form of prefatory distichs and a letter well into the 1480s. It was one among several literary projects sponsored by Hinderbach to inflame antisemitic sentiment throughout the region and beyond. Unlike the other works of Posculo, this poem was printed and in distribution well past 1511. Current research on the interpretation and historical analysis of the Symonidos is represented by the work of Stephen Bowd.

=== Lost works ===
Brescian historian Ottavio Rossi (1570–1630) reports two additional Latin works of Posculo which are now lost. One recounts the 1438 siege of Brescia by Milan in seven books of hexameters, De Obsidione Brixiae Libri VII, and the other in elegiac couplets, De Antiqua Urbe et Agro Brixiano, appears to mix a number of genres by recounting the history of the city and agriculture of the region. There is also some evidence of Greek works, though it is limited to a single couplet in praise of historiographer Elia Capriolo in a manuscript that has been documented in catalogs, but to date attempts to recover it have been unsuccessful. Recent research on the Padua manuscript containing the Constantinopolis and the Ultima Visio has argued on paleographical and codicological grounds that Latin translation of the Life of Andreas Salos may also be considered among the works of Posculo.

== Bibliography ==
- Bergantini, G. ed. 1740. Constantinopolis in Miscellanea di Varie Operette, vol. I Venice: Lazzaroni, 223-447.
- Bisanti, E. trans. 2000. Ubertino Posculo: Elogio di Brescia. Italian translation of Posculo's De Laudibus Brixiae. Brescia: Ateneo di Scienze Lettere ed Arti.
- Bowd, S. and J.D. Cullington, ed. and trans. 2012. On Everyone’s Lips’: Humanists, Jews, and the Tale of Simon of Trent. Latin text and English trans. Tempe: Brepolis.
- Bowd, S., "Tales from Trent: The construction of “Saint” Simon in Manuscript and Print, 1475-1511" in The Saint between Manuscript and Print: Authors, editors, publishers, readers and the phenomena of sanctity on the Italian peninsula, 1300-1600 ed. A. Fraizer. Toronto: University of Toronto Press.
- Cremona, V. 1963. “L’umanesimo bresciano: Ubertino Posculo.” Storia di Brescia, II: 568-570.
- Dethier, P. A. ed. 1872ca., Constantinopolis, in Documenta obsidionis Constantinopolitanis A.D. 1453/Monumenta Hungariae Historica XXII, Budapest: Athaneum nyomdájából, 102-261.
- Déroche, V. Trans. French. 2016. “Ubertino Posculo: Constantinopolis Livre IV”, notes to the text by Ganchou, T. in Constantinople 1453: Des Byzantines aux Ottomans Textes et documents, eds. V. Déroche and N. Vatin. Toulouse: Anacharsis. 359-395.
- Ellissen, A. ed. 1857. Constantinopolis, in Analekten der mittel- und neugriechischen Literatur, vol. 3 Leipzig: Wigand. Appendix, 3-83.
- Guerrini, P. ed. 1922. Pusculus: De laudibus Brixiae oratio, in Le Cronache bresciane inedite dei secoli XV-XIX, ed. P. Guerrini, 5 vols (Brescia: Editrice Brixia Sacra, 1922-1932), 2: 3-44.
- Macinanti, F. 2017 “Il Liber IV del poema Constantinopolis di Ubertino Posculo: Traduzione e commento” MA Thesis, Sapienza Università di Roma. Advisors: Francesca Rizzo Nervo and Luigi Silvano.
- McGann, M. 1984. “Haeresis Castigata: Troia Vindicata The Fall of Constantinople in Quattrocento Latin Poetry.” Res publica litterarum: studies in the classical tradition, 7: 137-145.
- Pertusi, A. Trans. Italian. 1976 [2006 Reprint, 6th ed.] ‘Ubertino Pusculo’ in La caduta di Costantinopoli, vol. I, A. Pertusi, ed., Milano: Mondadori.
- Philippides, M. 1989/1990. “The Name Sphrantes in Ubertino Posculo.” Ὀνόματα: revue onomastique grecque 13: 208-211.
- Philippides, M. and W. Hanak, 2012. The siege and the fall of Constantinople in 1453. Historiography, topography and military studies. New York: Routledge.
- Silvano, L. 2013. “‘How, why and when the Italians were separated from the Orthodox Christians’: a mid-Byzantine account of the origins of the Schism and its reception in the 13th–16th centuries.” In Réduire le schisme? Ecclésiologies et politiques de l’Union entre Orient et Occident (XIIIe-XVIIIe siècle), eds. M.H. Blanchet and F. Gabriel, Paris: l’Université Paris-Sorbonne press. 117-150.
- Silvano, L. 2017. “Lectures Apocalyptiques au Lendemain de la Catastrophe: La Traduction Latine de L’Ultime Vision de Daniel (BHG 1874) par Ubertino Posculo (A. 1454).” Revue des Études Byzantines 75: 283-312.
- Silvano, L. 2018. “Una pagina inedita degli Scrittori d’Italia del Mazzucchelli: la biograpfia dell’umanista bresciano Ubertino Posculo.” Giornale Storico della Letteratura Italiana CXCV: 76-89.
- Valseriati, E. ed. and trans. Italian. 2009. "La De Laudibus Brixiae Oratio di Ubertino Posculo." MA thesis. Università Cattolica del Sacro Cuore. Advisor: Carla Maria Monti.
- Valseriati, E. 2011. “Il rapporto della De Laudibus Brixiae oratio di Ubertino Posculo con le laudes civitatium.” Civiltà Bresciana 4:7-12.
- Valseriati, E. 2012. “Ubertino Posculo tra Brescia e Constantinopoli.” In Profili di Umanisti Brescani, C. Monti, ed., Travagliato-Bresci: Torre d’Ercole, 163-215.
- Valseriati, E. 2015. “Recuperi dalla libreria Saibante di Verona: Ubertino Posculo e Pietro Sacconi.” In Libri, lettori, immagini, ed. L. Rivali, Udine: Forum, 201-226.
- Valseriati, E. 2016. “POSCULO, Ubertino.” Dizionario Biografico degli Italiani 85. Roma: Treccani Press. URL:http://www.treccani.it/enciclopedia/ubertino-obertino-posculo_%28Dizionario-Biografico%29/
- Whitchurch, B. 2019. “The Constantinopolis of Ubertino Posculo: Translation and Commentary, Book 4.” PhD dissertation, Fordham University. Advisor: Matthew McGowan.
- Zabughin, V. 1915. “Ubertino Pusculo da Brescia e la sua Constantinopolis.” Roma e l’oriente, 55: 26-50.
- Zorzi, N. 2017/2018. “L’inedita traduzione latina della Apocalisse di Andrea Salòs attribuita all’umanista Ubertino Posculo.” Bizantinistica: Rivista di Studi Bizantini e Slavi, ser. II, XVIII, 307-350.
