= Nestor Iskander's Tale on the Taking of Tsargrad =

15th-century Russian tale on the fall of Constantinople

The Tale on the Taking of Tsargrad (Russian: Повесть о взятии Царьграда, romanized: Povest' o vzyatii Tsar'grada) is a late 15th-century Russian tale on the fall of Constantinople attributed to one Nestor Iskander.

It is extant in two redactions that date to the end of the 15th century and the beginning of the 16th century, both of which are thought to be derived from a single original now lost. The oldest and most authoritative version, the so-called Iskanderian redaction, is extant in a single copy and part of an early 16th-century manuscript from the Trinity Lavra of St. Sergius (Troitse-Sergieva Lavra Ms. No. 773), which includes a reference to the supposed author. The much more common chronicle redaction forms the final chapter of the Russian chronicle of 1512, and differs from the Iskanderian redaction chiefly in having no reference to the author.

== Description ==
The oldest and most authoritative version of the Tale is contained in the early 16th-century Troitse-Sergieva Lavra Ms. No. 773. It was discovered in 1884 by Archimandite Leonid at the Trinity Lavra of St. Sergius, who published the first printed edition of the manuscript two years later. Ms. No. 773 includes the name of the author, as well as a brief vita (life) of its author, Nestor Iskander. Since its discovery, it has been accepted as the fullest and earliest complete version, and it was likely compiled in the 1470s or the 1480s.

The vita appended to Ms. No. 773 says that Nestor Iskander was a Russian (Iskander being a Turkified form of Alexander) who was captured at a young age by the Ottomans and forced to convert to Islam, though he remained a Christian at heart. He was later attached to an artillery unit in the army. Before the siege of Constantinople began, he reached the outskirts of the city by 4 April 1453. He then escaped from his abductors and entered Constantinople by 18 April.

Nestor Iskander played a role in the defense of the city and was also involved in counting and possibly identifying the dead and wounded. He records that on 19 April, the Greek emperor had ordered "the clergy and the deacons to gather the dead and bury them". He reports an almost identical operation on 25 April using very similar language. His last count is recorded on the morning of 8 May. By 27 or 28 May, Nestor Iskander describes being overwhelmed by the task: "the fallen on both sides and above all those wounded, oh who can count [them]?".

== Historical accuracy ==
The tale's historical accuracy, as compared to other accounts of the fall of Constantinople, is fairly low. The massive cannons cast by the Hungarian master Orban for the Ottomans at Adrianople are said to be cast by the walls of Constantinople. The Ottoman attempts to storm the city walls, which took place at night to minimize casualties from defensive fire, take place during the day. Arguably the most impressive event of the campaign, the Ottomans' launching of galleys into the Golden Horn by pulling them overland, is conspicuously ignored. The astronomical and meteorological events that were taken as portents of the city's fall are confounded. Contrary to the account of the tale, the Orthodox Patriarch was not present in the city during the siege, and the Byzantine empress had deceased previously. Also highly suspicious in an account claiming to be by an eyewitness is the fact that topographical details are either lacking or confused, while exact dates are few and unreliable.

== Style ==
The tale is remarkable for its lively narrative and detailed depictions of battle scenes. After an initial part that relates the founding of Constantinople and its significance, the siege itself is narrated in terms of the valiant but tragic defense of the Byzantines against the Ottomans, who are bound to win not because of their military strength, but because God has decided to punish the Byzantines for their former sins. The leading characters are given psychological depth, and even the Ottoman sultan Mehmet II laments his losses. The portrayal of Mehmet II following the city's fall is unusual in terms of medieval religious fanaticism, in that he is merciful to the survivors, and glorifies the Byzantines and their last emperor, Constantine XI. In all, though utterly unreliable, the tale is a masterpiece in the genre of historical fiction.

== Significance ==
The Tale ends with reference to a Greek legend that Constantinople will eventually be liberated from heathens by a "blonde" or "fair-skinned people" (xanthon genos), but the Russian translation renders this as rusii rod, which associates rusii ("tawny", "light brown") with russkii ("Russian"). Such historiosophic views could easily become popular following the declaration of autocephaly by the Russian Orthodox Church and subsequent Russian ambitions to inherit Constantinople's historical mission. The Tale was widely circulated in Russia between the 16th and 18th centuries.

== Sources ==
- Bermel, Neil (1 January 1997). Context and the Lexicon in the Development of Russian Aspect. University of California Press. ISBN 978-0-520-09812-1.
- Dmitriev, L. A. et al. [eds]. Biblioteka literatury drevnei Rusi: vtoraia polovina XV veka. Saint Petersburg: Nauka, 1999.
- Likhachev, D. S. [ed]. Drevnerusskaia literatura: istochnikovedenie. Leningrad: Nauka, 1984.
- Philippides, Marios; Hanak, Walter K. (2 May 2017). The Siege and the Fall of Constantinople in 1453: Historiography, Topography, and Military Studies. Routledge. ISBN 978-1-317-01608-3.
- Terras, Victor (1 January 1985). Handbook of Russian Literature. Yale University Press. ISBN 978-0-300-04868-1.
