= Fall of Constantinople =

1453 Ottoman conquest of the Byzantine capital

- Part of the Byzantine–Ottoman wars
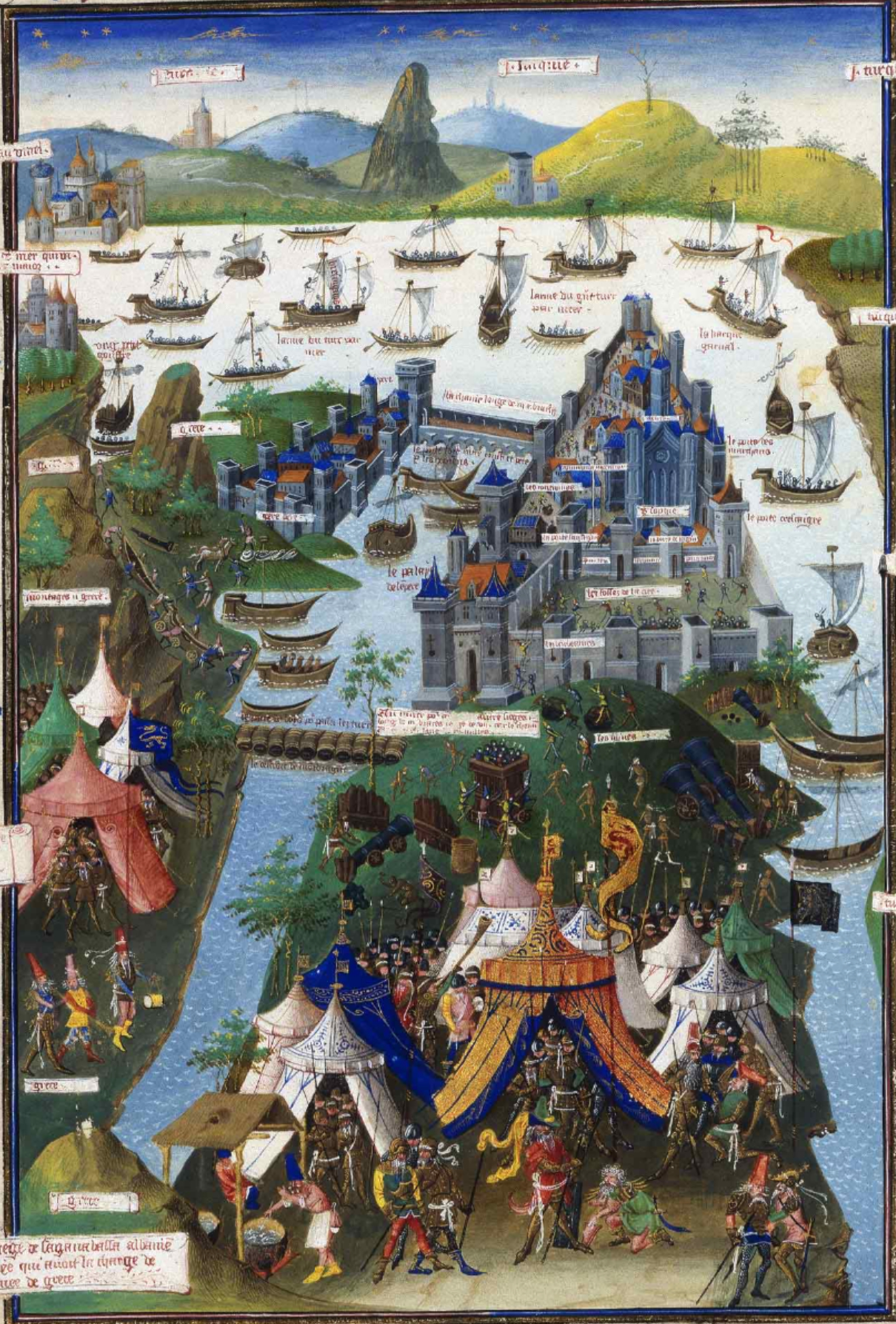
- The siege of Constantinople (1453), French miniature by Jean Le Tavernier after 1455
Date	6 April – 29 May 1453 (1 month, 3 weeks and 2 days)
Location	Constantinople, Byzantine Empire (present-day Istanbul, Turkey) 41.030°N 28.935°E
Result	Ottoman victory
Territorial changes	Constantinople conquered by the Ottomans; Fall of the Byzantine Empire

Belligerents
Ottoman Empire: Serbian Despotate (Note: Đurađ Branković, being a vassal of the Ottoman Empire, was asked by Mehmed to send 1,500 soldiers to support him in his campaign against the Emirate of Karaman. As such, the Serbians believed that they would be fighting against the Karamanids, but they were actually deployed in Constantinople instead. When they found out that the attack was going to be carried out in Constantinople, they wanted to return home, but they were threatened to be killed if they did so.)	Byzantine Empire; Republic of Genoa; Republic of Venice; Papal States; Crown of Aragon; Kingdom of Sicily; Kingdom of France; Varangian Guard; Orhan Çelebi loyalists

Commanders and leaders
Mehmed II; Halil Pasha (executed); Zagan Pasha; Suleiman Baltoghlu (WIA); Karaca Pasha; Hamza Bey; Mahmud Pasha; Ulubatlı Hasan †; Hadım Şehabeddin	Constantine XI †; Loukas Notaras (executed); Theophilos Palaiologos †; Demetrios Kantakouzenos (executed); Andronikos Kantakouzenos (executed); Giovanni Giustiniani (DOW); Gabriele Trevisano (POW); Alviso Diedo (WIA); Gabriele Orsini del Balzo †; Cardinal Isidore (POW); Johannes Grant †; Orhan Çelebi (executed)

Strength
Land forces: (Ottoman Empire) 100,000 soldiers in total, (Note: Some contemporaneous Western sources gave exaggerated figures ranging from 160,000 to 300,000.) including: 75,000 regulars; 20,000 irregulars; 5,000 Janissaries; Naval forces: 31 galleys; 95 large row boats; Unknown but large amount of Non-combatants	Land forces: 8,000 soldiers in total, including: 5,000 Byzantine soldiers; 2,000 Western soldiers (Note: Western soldiers included, but weren't limited to, Italians (Venetians, Genoese, Anconitans, Sicilians and others), French, Spaniards, Germans and Scots.); 600 Orhan Çelebi loyalists; 200 Catalan retinue; 200 Cretan archers; Naval forces: 26 ships; 10 Byzantine; 8 Venetian; 5 Genoese; 1 Catalan; 1 Anconitan; 1 Provençal

Casualties and losses
Heavy	Heavy
- 4,000 Byzantine civilians killed 550+ Venetian civilians killed 30,000 enslaved or sold

Constantinople, the capital city of the Byzantine Empire, was captured by the Ottoman Empire on 29 May 1453 as part of the culmination of a 53-day siege which had begun on 6 April.

The attacking Ottoman Army, which significantly outnumbered Constantinople's defenders, was commanded by Sultan Mehmed II (later titled "the Conqueror"), while the Byzantine army was led by Emperor Constantine XI Palaiologos. After conquering the city, Mehmed II made Constantinople the new Ottoman capital, replacing Adrianople.

The fall of Constantinople and of the Byzantine Empire was a watershed moment of the Late Middle Ages, marking the effective end of the Roman Empire, a state which began in roughly 27 BC and had lasted nearly 1,500 years. For many modern historians, the fall of Constantinople marks the end of the medieval period and the beginning of the early modern period. The city's fall also stood as a turning point in military history. Since ancient times, cities and castles had depended upon ramparts and walls to repel invaders. The walls of Constantinople, especially the Theodosian walls, protected Constantinople from attack for 800 years and were noted as some of the most advanced defensive systems in the world at the time. However, these fortifications were overcome by Ottoman infantry with the support of gunpowder, specifically from cannons and bombards, heralding a change in siege warfare. The Ottoman cannons repeatedly fired massive cannonballs weighing 500 kilograms (1,100 lb) over 1.5 kilometres (0.93 mi) which created gaps in the Theodosian walls for the Ottoman siege.

== Background ==
Constantinople had been an imperial capital since its consecration in 330 under Roman emperor Constantine the Great. In the following eleven centuries, the city had been besieged many times but was captured only once: the Sack of Constantinople during the Fourth Crusade in 1204. The crusaders established an unstable Latin state in and around Constantinople while the remainder of the Byzantine Empire splintered into a number of successor states, notably Nicaea, Epirus and Trebizond. They fought as allies against the Latin establishments, but also fought among themselves for the Byzantine throne.

The Nicaeans eventually reconquered Constantinople from the Latins in 1261, reestablishing the Byzantine Empire under the Palaiologos dynasty. Thereafter, there was little peace for the much-weakened empire as it fended off successive attacks by the Latins, Serbs, Bulgarians and Ottoman Turks.

Between 1346 and 1349, the Black Death killed almost half of the inhabitants of Constantinople. The city was further depopulated by the general economic and territorial decline of the empire, and by 1453, it consisted of a series of walled villages separated by vast fields encircled by the fifth-century Theodosian walls.

By 1450, the empire was exhausted and had shrunk to a few square kilometers outside the city of Constantinople itself, the Princes' Islands in the Sea of Marmara and the Peloponnese with its cultural center at Mystras. The Empire of Trebizond, an independent successor state that formed in the aftermath of the Fourth Crusade, was also present at the time on the coast of the Black Sea.

== Preparations ==
When Mehmed II succeeded his father in 1451, he was 19 years old. Many European courts assumed that the young Ottoman ruler would not seriously challenge Christian hegemony in the Balkans and the Aegean. In fact, Europe celebrated Mehmed coming to the throne and hoped his inexperience would lead the Ottomans astray. This calculation was boosted by Mehmed's friendly overtures to the European envoys at his new court. But Mehmed's mild words were not matched by his actions. By early 1452, work began on the construction of a second fortress (Rumeli hisarı) on the European side of the Bosphorus, several miles north of Constantinople. The new fortress sat directly across the strait from the Anadolu Hisarı fortress, built by Mehmed's great-grandfather Bayezid I. This pair of fortresses ensured complete control of sea traffic on the Bosphorus and defended against attack by the Genoese colonies on the Black Sea coast to the north. In fact, the new fortress was called Boğazkesen, which means "strait-blocker" or "throat-cutter". The wordplay emphasizes its strategic position: in Turkish boğaz means both "strait" and "throat". In October 1452, Mehmed ordered Turakhan Beg to station a large garrison force in the Peloponnese to block Thomas and Demetrios (despotes in Southern Greece) from providing aid to their brother Constantine XI Palaiologos during the impending siege of Constantinople. (Note: While Mehmed II had been steadily preparing for the siege of Constantinople, he had sent the old general Turakhan and the latter's two sons, Ahmed Beg and Omar Beg, to invade the Morea and to remain there all winter also to prevent the despots Thomas and Demetrius from giving aid to Constantine XI.) Karaca Pasha, the beylerbeyi of Rumelia, sent men to prepare the roads from Adrianople to Constantinople so that bridges could cope with the massive cannons. Fifty carpenters and 200 artisans also strengthened the roads where necessary. The Greek historian Michael Critobulus quotes Mehmed II's speech to his soldiers before the siege:

My friends and men of my empire! You all know very well that our forefathers secured this kingdom that we now hold at the cost of many struggles and very great dangers and that, having passed it along in succession from their fathers, from father to son, they handed it down to me. For some of the oldest of you were sharers in many of the exploits carried through by them—those at least of you who are of maturer years—and the younger of you have heard of these deeds from your fathers. They are not such very ancient events nor of such a sort as to be forgotten through the lapse of time. Still, the eyewitness of those who have seen testifies better than does the hearing of deeds that happened but yesterday or the day before.

=== European support ===
Byzantine Emperor Constantine XI swiftly understood Mehmed's true intentions and turned to Western Europe for help; but now the price of centuries of war and enmity between the eastern and western churches had to be paid. Since the mutual excommunications of 1054, the Pope in Rome was committed to establishing authority over the eastern church. The union was agreed by the Byzantine Emperor Michael VIII Palaiologos in 1274, at the Second Council of Lyon, and indeed, some Palaiologoi emperors had since been received into the Latin Church. Emperor John VIII Palaiologos had also recently negotiated union with Pope Eugene IV, with the Council of Florence of 1439 proclaiming a Bull of Union. The imperial efforts to impose union were met with strong resistance in Constantinople. A propaganda initiative was stimulated by anti-unionist Orthodox partisans in Constantinople; the population, as well as the laity and leadership of the Byzantine Church, became bitterly divided. Latent ethnic hatred between Greeks and Italians, stemming from the events of the Massacre of the Latins in 1182 by the Greeks and the Sack of Constantinople in 1204 by the Latins, played a significant role. Ultimately, the attempted union between east and west failed, greatly annoying Pope Nicholas V and the hierarchy of the Roman church.

In the summer of 1452, when Rumeli Hisarı was completed and the threat of the Ottomans had become imminent, Constantine wrote to the Pope, promising to implement the union, which was declared valid by a half-hearted imperial court on 12 December 1452. Although he was eager for an advantage, Pope Nicholas V did not have the influence the Byzantines thought he had over the Western kings and princes, some of whom were wary of increasing papal control. Furthermore, these Western rulers did not have the wherewithal to contribute to the effort, especially in light of the weakened state of France and England from the Hundred Years' War, Spain's involvement in the Reconquista, the internecine fighting in the Holy Roman Empire, and Hungary and Poland's defeat at the Battle of Varna of 1444. Although some troops did arrive from the mercantile city-states in northern Italy, the Western contribution was not adequate to counterbalance Ottoman strength. Some Western individuals, however, came to help defend the city on their own account. Cardinal Isidore, funded by the Pope, arrived in 1452 with 200 archers. An accomplished soldier from Genoa, Giovanni Giustiniani, arrived in January 1453 with 400 men from Genoa and 300 men from Genoese Chios. As a specialist in defending walled cities, Giustiniani was immediately given the overall command of the defence of the land walls by the Emperor. The Byzantines knew him by the Latin spelling of his name, "John Justinian", named after the famous 6th century Byzantine emperor Justinian the Great. Around the same time, the captains of the Venetian ships that happened to be present in the Golden Horn offered their services to the Emperor, barring contrary orders from Venice, and Pope Nicholas undertook to send three ships laden with provisions, which set sail near the end of March. From the Kingdoms of Naples and Sicily arrived in Constantinople the condottiero Gabriele Orsini del Balzo, duke of Venosa and count of Ugento, together with 200 Neapolitan archers, who died fighting for the defense of the capital of the Byzantine Empire.

Meanwhile, in Venice, deliberations were taking place concerning the kind of assistance the Republic would lend to Constantinople. The Senate decided upon sending a fleet in February 1453, but the fleet's departure was delayed until April, when it was already too late for ships to assist in battle. Further undermining Byzantine morale, seven Italian ships with around 700 men, despite having sworn to defend Constantinople, slipped out of the capital the moment Giustiniani arrived. At the same time, Constantine's attempts to appease the Sultan with gifts ended with the execution of the Emperor's ambassadors.

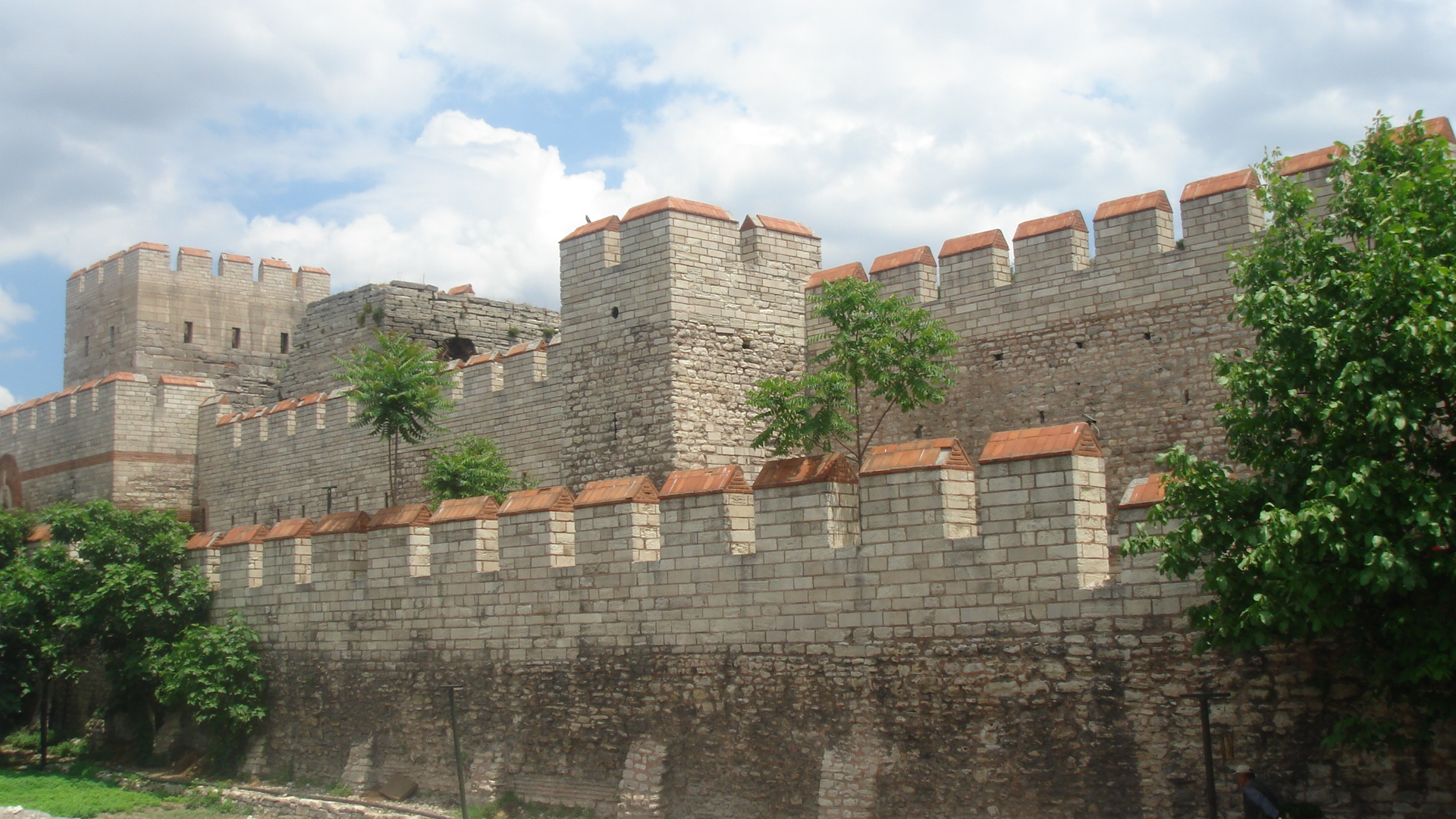
Restored walls of Constantinople

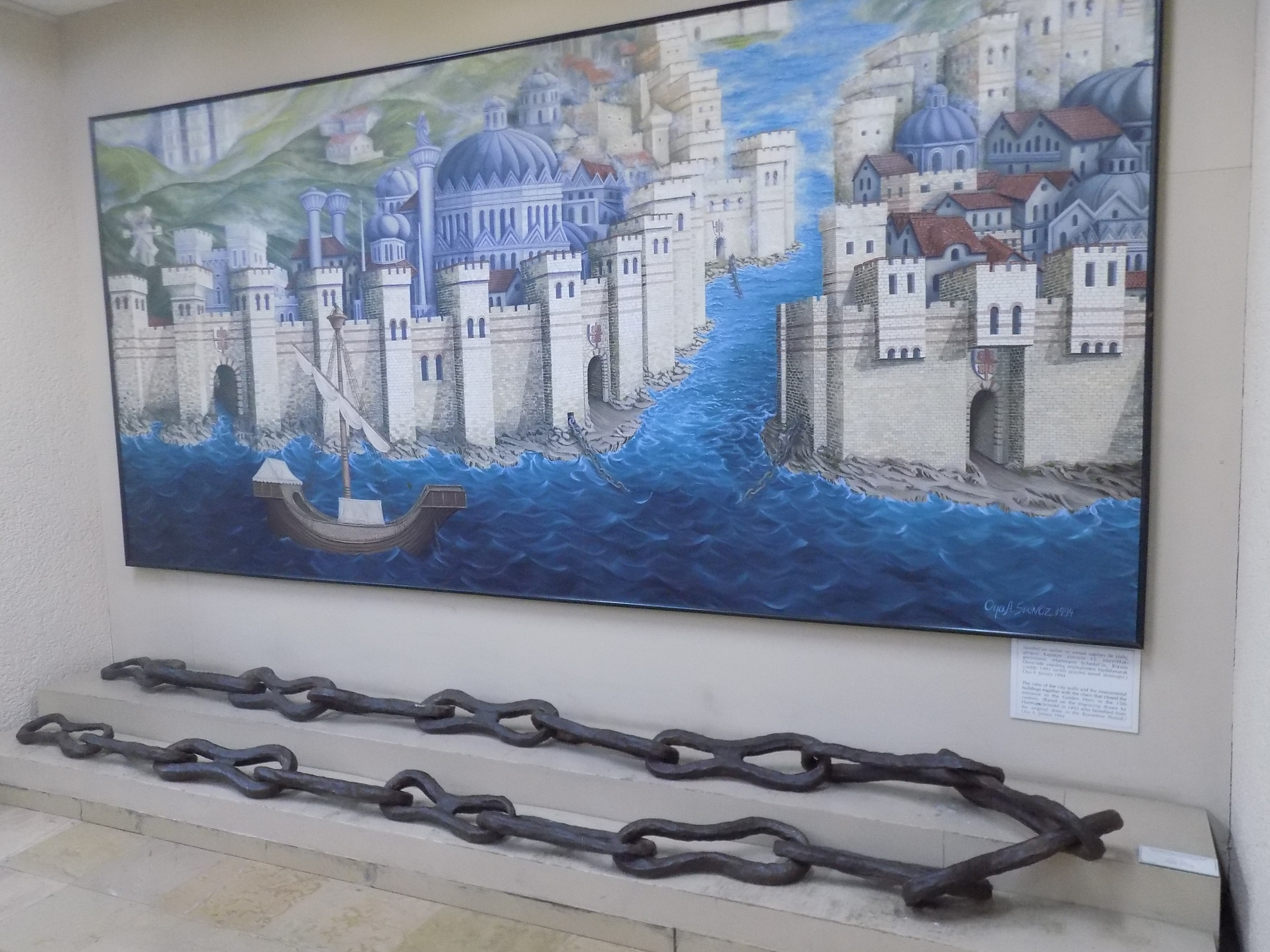
The chain that closed off the entrance to the Golden Horn in 1453, now on display in the İstanbul Archaeology Museums

=== Great Chain of the Golden Horn ===
Fearing a possible naval attack along the shores of the Golden Horn, Emperor Constantine XI ordered that a defensive chain be placed at the mouth of the harbour. This chain, which floated on logs, was strong enough to prevent any Turkish ship from entering the harbour. This device was one of two that gave the Byzantines some hope of extending the siege until the possible arrival of foreign help. This strategy was used because in 1204, the armies of the Fourth Crusade successfully circumvented Constantinople's land defences by breaching the Golden Horn Wall, which faces the Horn. Another strategy employed by the Byzantines was the repair and fortification of the land wall (Theodosian walls). Constantine deemed it necessary to ensure that the Blachernae district's wall was the most fortified because that section of the wall protruded northwards. The land fortifications consisted of a 60 ft (18 m) wide moat fronting inner and outer crenellated walls studded with towers every 45–55 metres.

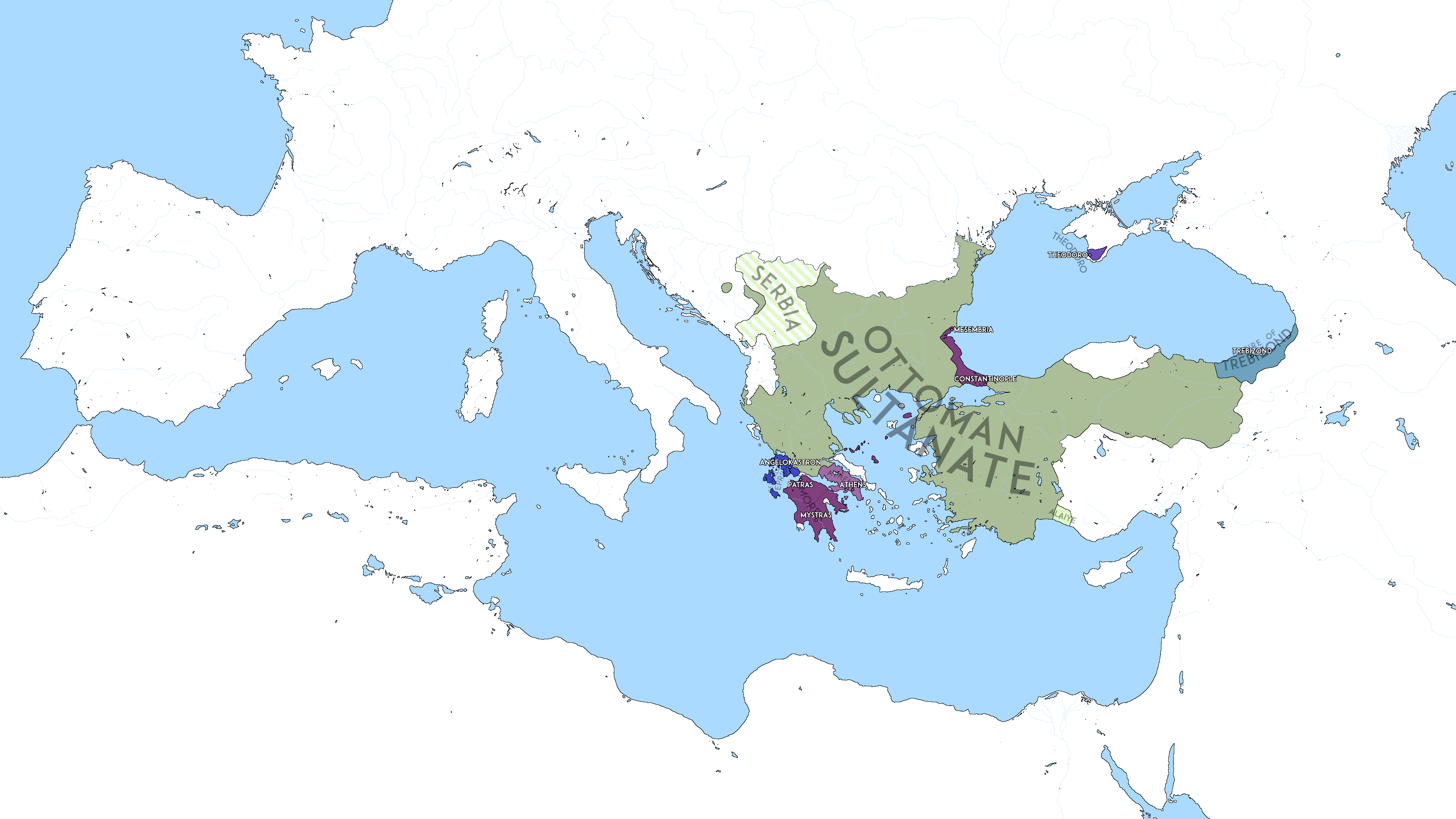
The Ottoman Sultanate and the Eastern Roman Empire in April 1453

=== Strength ===
Map of Constantinople and the dispositions of the defenders and the besiegers

The army defending Constantinople was relatively small, totalling about 7,000 men, 2,000 of whom were foreigners. (Note: According to Sphrantzes, whom Constantine had ordered to make a census, the Emperor was appalled when the number of native men capable of bearing arms turned out to be only 4,983. Leonardo di Chio gave a number of 6,000 Greeks.) The population decline also had a huge impact upon Constantinople's defense capabilities. At the end of March 1453, Constantine ordered a census of districts to record how many able-bodied men were in the city and whatever weapons each possessed for defense. George Sphrantzes, the faithful chancellor of the last emperor, recorded that "in spite of the great size of our city, our defenders amounted to 4,773 Greeks, as well as just 200 foreigners". In addition there were volunteers from outside, the "Genoese, Venetians and those who came secretly from Galata to help the defense", who numbered "hardly as many as three thousand", amounting to something under 8,000 men in total to defend a perimeter wall of twelve miles. At the onset of the siege, probably fewer than 50,000 people were living within the walls, including the refugees from the surrounding area. (Note: The Spanish Cristóbal de Villalón claims there were ' 60,000 Turkish households, 40,000 Greek and Armenian, 10,000 Jewish.) Turkish commander Dorgano, who was in Constantinople working for the Emperor, was also guarding one of the quarters of the city on the seaward side with the Turks in his pay. These Turks kept loyal to the Emperor and perished in the ensuing battle. The defending army's Genoese corps were well trained and equipped, while the rest of the army consisted of small numbers of well-trained soldiers, armed civilians, sailors and volunteer forces from foreign communities, and finally monks. The garrison used a few small-calibre artillery pieces, which in the end proved ineffective. The rest of the citizens repaired walls, stood guard on observation posts, collected and distributed food provisions, and collected gold and silver objects from churches to melt down into coins to pay the foreign soldiers.

The Ottomans had a much larger force. Recent studies and Ottoman archival data state that there were some 50,000–80,000 Ottoman soldiers, including between 5,000 and 10,000 Janissaries, 70 cannons, and an elite infantry corps, and thousands of Christian troops, notably 1,500 Serbian cavalry that Đurađ Branković was forced to supply as part of his obligation to the Ottoman sultan — just a few months before, Branković had supplied the money for the reconstruction of the walls of Constantinople. Contemporaneous Western witnesses of the siege, who tend to exaggerate the military power of the Sultan, provide disparate and higher numbers ranging from 160,000 to 300,000 (Niccolò Barbaro: 160,000; the Florentine merchant Jacopo Tedaldi and the Great Logothete George Sphrantzes: 200,000; the Cardinal Isidore of Kiev and the Archbishop of Mytilene Leonardo di Chio: 300,000).

==== Ottoman dispositions and strategies ====
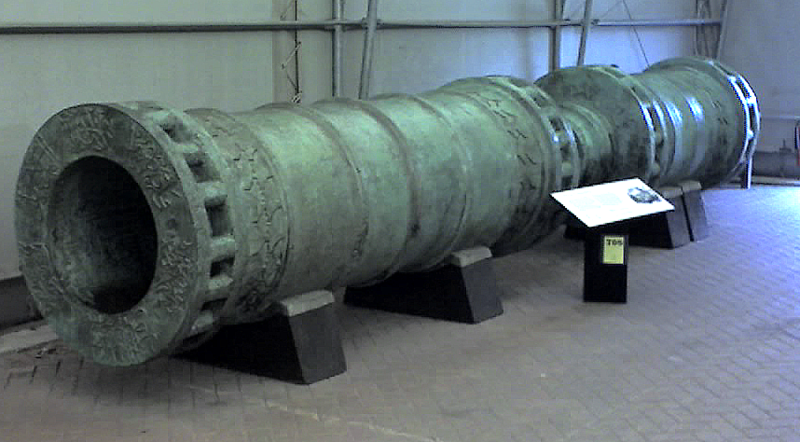
The Dardanelles Gun, cast by Munir Ali in 1464, is similar to bombards used by the Ottoman besiegers of Constantinople in 1453 (British Royal Armouries collection).

Mehmed built a fleet (crewed partially by Spanish sailors from Gallipoli) to besiege the city from the sea. Contemporary estimates of the strength of the Ottoman fleet span from 110 ships to 430 (Tedaldi: 110; Barbaro: 145; Ubertino Pusculo: 160, Isidore of Kiev and Leonardo di Chio: 200–250; (Sphrantzes): 430). A more realistic modern estimate predicts a fleet strength of 110 ships comprising 70 large galleys, 5 ordinary galleys, 10 smaller galleys, 25 large rowing boats, and 75 horse-transports.

Before the siege of Constantinople, it was known that the Ottomans had the ability to cast medium-sized cannons, but the range of some pieces they were able to field far surpassed the defenders' expectations. The Ottomans deployed a number of cannons, anywhere from 12 to 62 cannons. They were built at foundries that employed Turkish cannon founders and technicians, most notably Saruca, in addition to at least one foreign cannon founder, Orban (also called Urban). Most of the cannons at the siege were built by Turkish engineers, including a large bombard by Saruca, while one cannon was built by Orban, who also contributed a large bombard.

Orban, a Hungarian (though some suggest he was German), was a somewhat mysterious figure. His 27-foot-long (8.2 m) cannon was named "Basilica" and was able to hurl a 600-pound (270 kg) stone ball over a mile (1.6 km). Orban initially tried to sell his services to the Byzantines, but they were unable to secure the funds needed to hire him. Orban then left Constantinople and approached Mehmed II, claiming that his weapon could blast "the walls of Babylon itself". Given abundant funds and materials, the Hungarian engineer built the gun within three months at Edirne. However, this was the only cannon that Orban built for the Ottoman forces at Constantinople, and it had several drawbacks: it took three hours to reload; cannonballs were in very short supply; and the cannon is said to have collapsed under its own recoil after six weeks. The account of the cannon's collapse is disputed, given that it was only reported in the letter of Archbishop Leonardo di Chio and in the later, and often unreliable, Russian chronicle of Nestor Iskander.

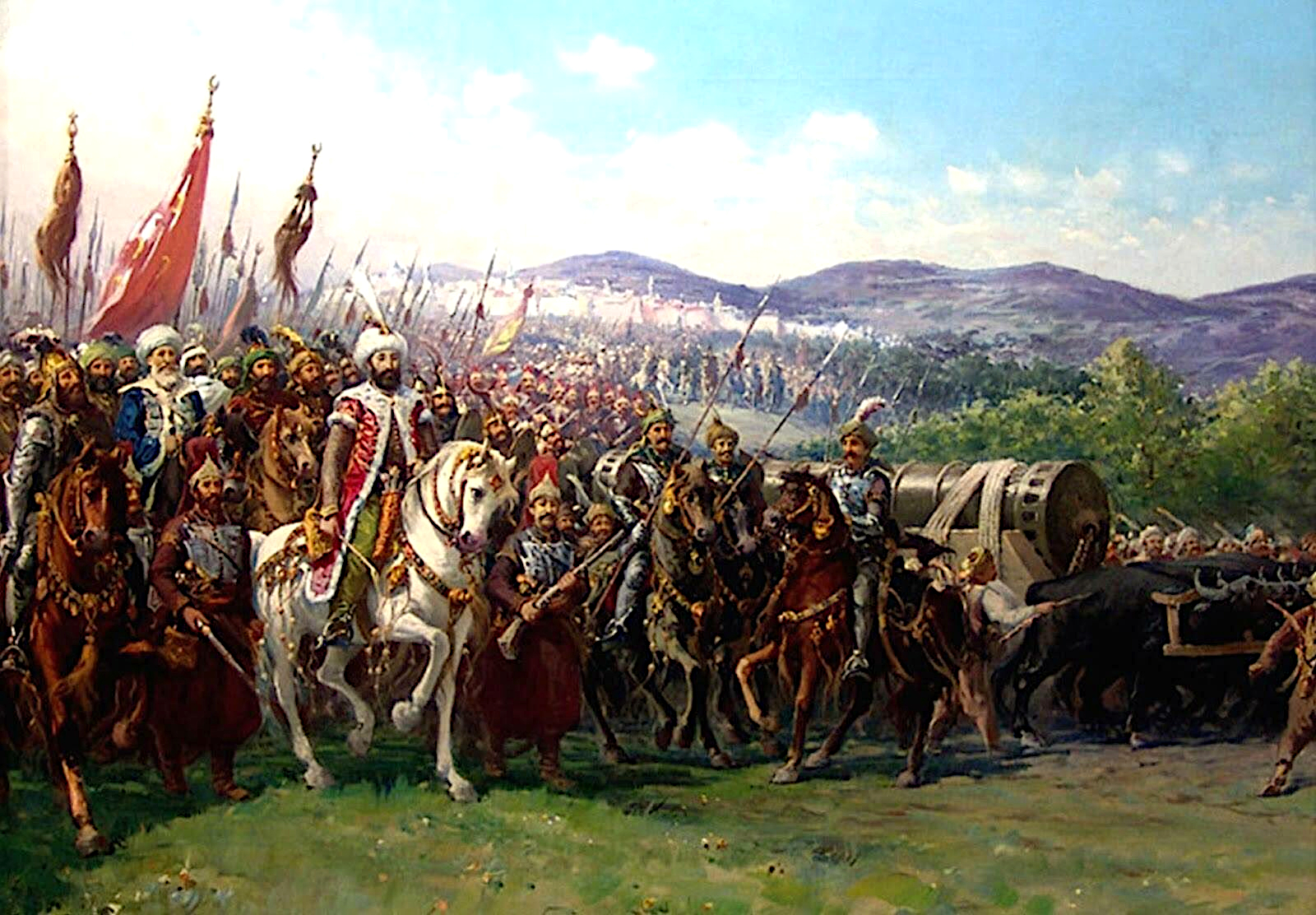
Modern painting of Mehmed and the Ottoman Army approaching Constantinople with a giant bombard, by Fausto Zonaro

Having previously established a large foundry about 150 miles (240 km) away, Mehmed now had to undertake the painstaking process of transporting his massive artillery pieces. In preparation for the final assault, Mehmed had an artillery train of 70 large pieces dragged from his headquarters at Edirne, in addition to the bombards cast on the spot. This train included Orban's enormous cannon, which was said to have been dragged from Edirne by a crew of 60 oxen and over 400 men. There was another large bombard, independently built by Turkish engineer Saruca, that was also used in the battle.

Mehmed planned to attack the Theodosian walls, the intricate series of walls and ditches protecting Constantinople from an attack from the West and the only part of the city not surrounded by water. His army encamped outside the city on 2 April 1453, the Monday after Easter.

The bulk of the Ottoman army was encamped south of the Golden Horn. The regular European troops, stretched out along the entire length of the walls, were commanded by Karadja Pasha. The regular troops from Anatolia under Ishak Pasha were stationed south of the Lycus down to the Sea of Marmara. Mehmed himself erected his red-and-gold tent near the Mesoteichion, where the guns and the elite Janissary regiments were positioned. The Bashi-bazouks were spread out behind the front lines. Other troops under Zagan Pasha were employed north of the Golden Horn. Communication was maintained by a road that had been destroyed over the marshy head of the Horn.

The Ottomans were experts in laying siege to cities. They knew that in order to prevent diseases they had to burn corpses, sanitarily dispose of excrement, and carefully scrutinize their sources of water.

==== Byzantine dispositions and tactics ====
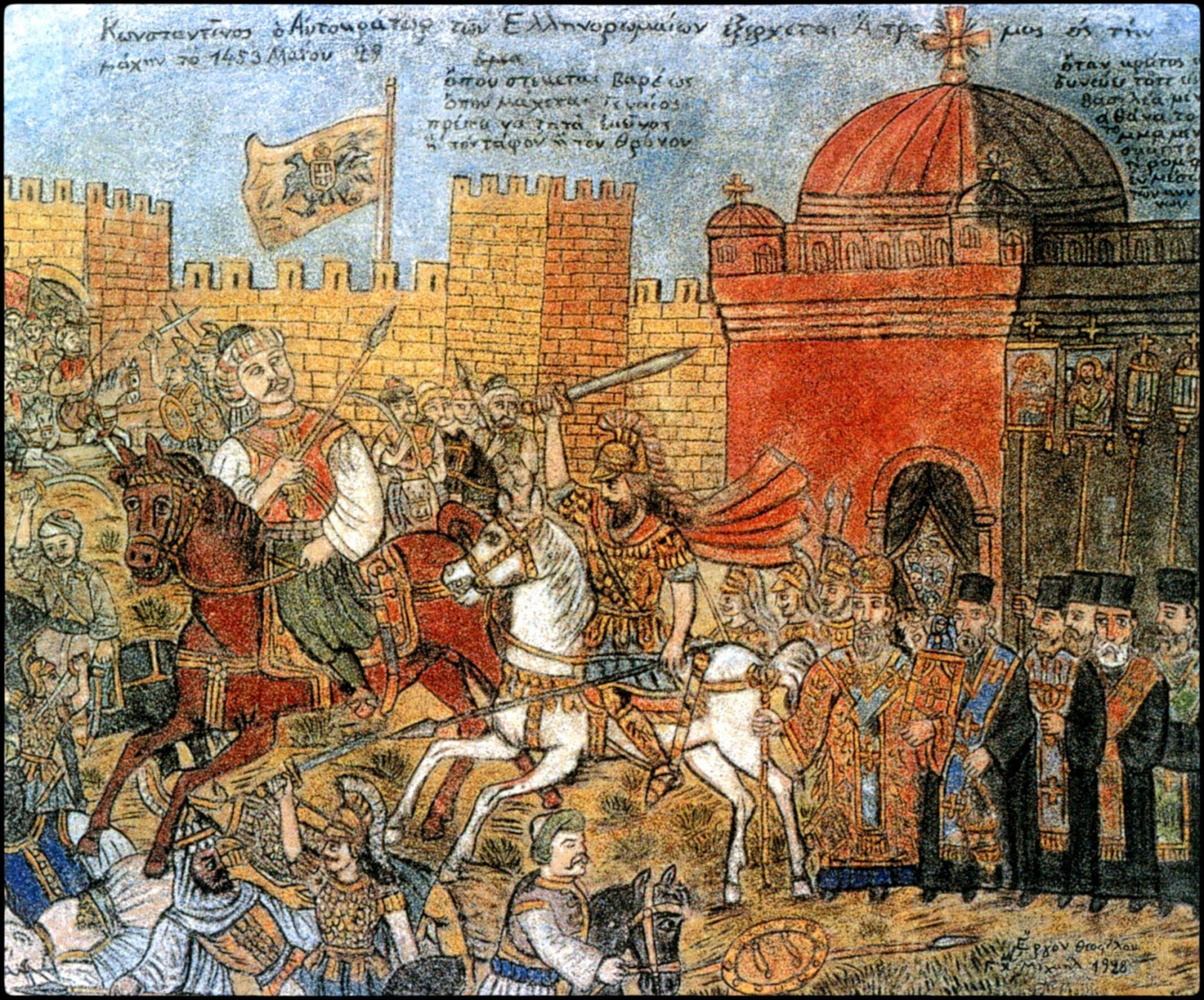
Painting of the Fall of Constantinople, by Theophilos Hatzimihail

The city had about 20 km of walls (land walls: 5.5 km; sea walls along the Golden Horn: 7 km; sea walls along the Sea of Marmara: 7.5 km), one of the strongest sets of fortified walls in existence. The walls had recently been repaired (under John VIII) and were in fairly good shape, giving the defenders sufficient reason to believe that they could hold out until help from the West arrived. In addition, the defenders were relatively well-equipped with a fleet of 26 ships: five from Genoa, five from Venice, three from Venetian Crete, one from Ancona, one from Aragon, one from France, and about 10 from the empire itself.

On 5 April, the Sultan himself arrived with his last troops, and the defenders took up their positions. As Byzantine numbers were insufficient to occupy the walls in their entirety, it had been decided that only the outer walls would be guarded. Constantine and his Greek troops guarded the Mesoteichion, the middle section of the land walls, where they were crossed by the river Lycus. This section was considered the weakest spot in the walls and an attack was feared here most. Giustiniani was stationed to the north of the emperor, at the Charisian Gate (Myriandrion); later during the siege, he was shifted to the Mesoteichion to join Constantine, leaving the Myriandrion to the charge of the Bocchiardi brothers. Girolamo Minotto and his Venetians were stationed in the Blachernae Palace, together with Teodoro Caristo, the Langasco brothers, and Archbishop Leonardo of Chios.

To the left of the emperor, further south, were the commanders Cataneo, who led Genoese troops, and Theophilus Palaeologus, who guarded the Pegae Gate with Greek soldiers. The section of the land walls from the Pegae Gate to the Golden Gate (itself guarded by a Genoese called Manuel) was defended by the Venetian Filippo Contarini, while Demetrius Cantacuzenus had taken position on the southernmost part of the Theodosian wall. The sea walls were guarded more sparsely, with Jacobo Contarini at Stoudion, a makeshift defence force of Greek monks to his left hand, and Prince Orhan at the Harbour of Eleutherios. Genoese and Catalan troops were stationed at the Great Palace; Cardinal Isidore of Kiev guarded the tip of the peninsula near the boom. Finally, the sea walls at the southern shore of the Golden Horn were defended by Venetian and Genoese sailors under Gabriele Trevisano.

Two tactical reserves were kept behind in the city: one in the Petra district just behind the land walls and one near the Church of the Holy Apostles, under the command of Loukas Notaras and Nicephorus Palaeologus, respectively. The Venetian Alviso Diedo commanded the ships in the harbour. Although the Byzantines also had cannons, the weapons were much smaller than those of the Ottomans, and the recoil tended to damage their own walls. According to David Nicolle, despite many odds, the idea that Constantinople was inevitably doomed is incorrect and the situation was not as one-sided as a simple glance at a map might suggest. It has also been claimed that Constantinople was "the best-defended city in Europe" at that time.

== Siege ==
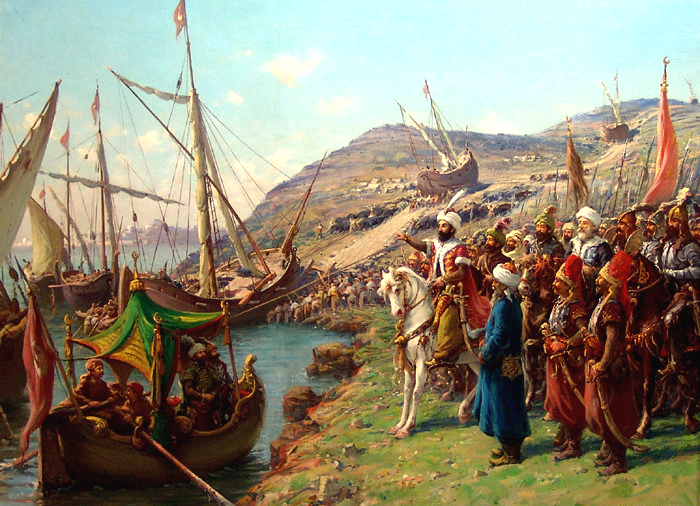
Painting by Fausto Zonaro depicting the Ottoman Turks transporting their fleet overland into the Golden Horn

At the beginning of the siege, Mehmed sent out some of his best troops to reduce the remaining Byzantine strongholds outside the city of Constantinople. The fortress of Therapia on the Bosphorus and a smaller castle at the village of Studius near the Sea of Marmara were taken within a few days. The Princes' Islands in the Sea of Marmara were likely taken by Admiral Baltoghlu's fleet during this phase of the siege. Mehmed's massive cannons fired on the walls for weeks but due to their imprecision and extremely slow rate of fire, the Byzantines were able to repair most of the damage after each shot, mitigating the effect of the Ottoman artillery.

Despite some probing attacks, the Ottoman fleet under Baltoghlu could not enter the Golden Horn due to the chain across the entrance. Although one of the fleet's main tasks was to prevent any foreign ships from entering the Golden Horn, on 20 April, a small flotilla of four Christian ships managed to get in after some heavy fighting, an event which strengthened the morale of the defenders and caused embarrassment to the Sultan. (Note: These were the three Genoese ships sent by the Pope, joined by a large Imperial transport ship which had been sent on a foraging mission to Sicily previous to the siege and was on its way back to Constantinople.) Baltoghlu was most likely injured in the eye during the skirmish. Mehmed stripped Baltoghlu of his wealth and property and gave it to the janissaries and ordered him to be whipped 100 times.

Mehmed ordered the construction of a road of greased logs across Galata on the north side of the Golden Horn and dragged his ships over the hill, directly into the Golden Horn on 22 April, bypassing the chain barrier. This action seriously threatened the flow of supplies from Genoese ships from the nominally neutral colony of Pera and it demoralized the Byzantine defenders. On the night of 28 April, an attempt was made to destroy the Ottoman ships already in the Golden Horn using fire ships but the Ottomans forced the Christians to retreat with many casualties. Forty Italians escaped their sinking ships and swam to the northern shore. On orders of Mehmed, they were impaled on stakes, in sight of the city's defenders on the sea walls across the Golden Horn. In retaliation, the defenders brought their Ottoman prisoners, 260 in all, to the walls, where they were executed, one by one, before the eyes of the Ottomans. With the failure of their attack on the Ottoman vessels, the defenders were forced to disperse part of their forces to defend the sea walls along the Golden Horn.

The Ottoman army had made several frontal assaults on the land wall of Constantinople, but they were costly failures. Venetian surgeon Niccolò Barbaro, describing in his diary one such land attack by the Janissaries, wrote

They found the Turks coming right up under the walls and seeking battle, particularly the Janissaries ... and when one or two of them were killed, at once more Turks came and took away the dead ones ... without caring how near they came to the city walls. Our men shot at them with guns and crossbows, aiming at the Turk who was carrying away his dead countryman, and both of them would fall to the ground dead, and then there came other Turks and took them away, none fearing death, but being willing to let ten of themselves be killed rather than suffer the shame of leaving a single Turkish corpse by the walls.

After these inconclusive attacks, the Ottomans sought to break through the walls by constructing tunnels to mine them from mid-May to 25 May. Many of the sappers were miners of Serbian origin sent from Novo Brdo under the command of Zagan Pasha. An engineer named Johannes Grant, a German who came with the Genoese contingent, had counter-mines dug, allowing Byzantine troops to enter the mines and kill the miners. (Note: Runciman speculates that he may have been Scottish.) The Byzantines intercepted the first tunnel on the night of 16 May. Subsequent tunnels were interrupted on 21, 23 and 25 May, and destroyed with Greek fire and vigorous combat. On 23 May, the Byzantines captured and tortured two Turkish officers, who revealed the location of all the Turkish tunnels, which were destroyed.

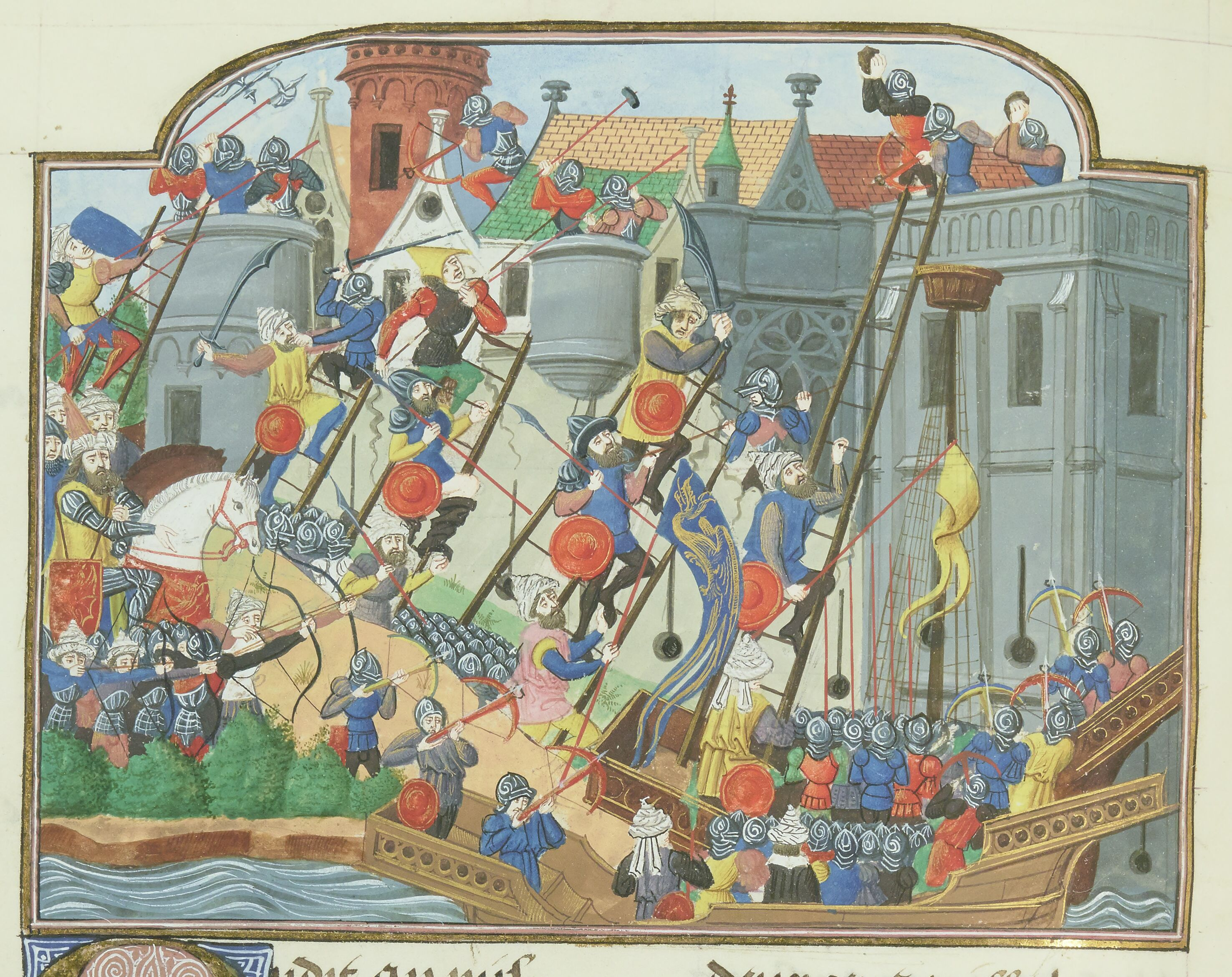
Siege of Constantinople as depicted between 1470 and 1479

On 21 May, Mehmed sent an ambassador to Constantinople and offered to lift the siege if they gave him the city. He promised he would allow the Emperor and any other inhabitants to leave with their possessions. He would recognize the Emperor as governor of the Peloponnese. Lastly, he guaranteed the safety of the population that might choose to remain in the city. Constantine XI only agreed to pay higher tributes to the sultan and recognized the status of all the conquered castles and lands in the hands of the Turks as Ottoman possessions. The Emperor was not willing to leave the city without a fight:

As to surrendering the city to you, it is not for me to decide or for anyone else of its citizens; for all of us have reached the mutual decision to die of our own free will, without any regard for our lives. (Note: Original text: Τὸ δὲ τὴν πόλιν σοῖ δοῦναι οὔτ' ἐμὸν ἐστίν οὔτ' ἄλλου τῶν κατοικούντων ἐν ταύτῃ• κοινῇ γὰρ γνώμῃ πάντες αὐτοπροαιρέτως ἀποθανοῦμεν καὶ οὐ φεισόμεθα τῆς ζωῆς ἡμῶν.)

Around this time, Mehmed had a final council with his senior officers. Here he encountered some resistance; one of his Viziers, the veteran Halil Pasha, who had always disapproved of Mehmed's plans to conquer the city, now admonished him to abandon the siege in the face of recent adversity. Zagan Pasha argued against Halil Pasha and insisted on an immediate attack. Believing that the Byzantine defence was already weakened sufficiently, Mehmed planned to overpower the walls by sheer force and started preparations for a final all-out offensive.

=== Final assault ===
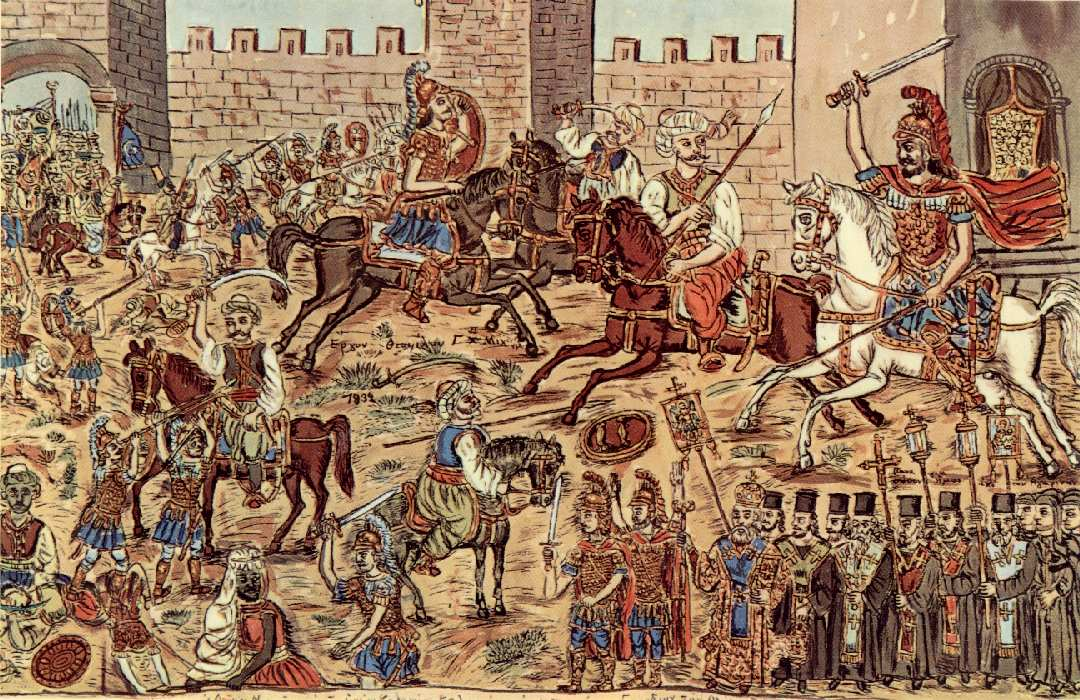
Painting by the Greek folk painter Theophilos Hatzimihail showing the battle inside the city. Constantine is visible on a white horse.

Preparations for the final assault began in the evening of 26 May and continued to the next day. For 36 hours after the war council decided to attack, the Ottomans extensively mobilized their manpower for the general offensive. Prayer and resting was then granted to the soldiers on 28 May before the final assault would be launched. On the Byzantine side, a small Venetian fleet of 12 ships, after having searched the Aegean, reached Constantinople on 27 May and reported to the Emperor that no large Venetian relief fleet was on its way. On 28 May, as the Ottoman army prepared for the final assault, mass religious processions were held in the city. In the evening, a solemn last ceremony of Vespers was held in the Hagia Sophia, in which the Emperor with representatives and nobility of both the Latin and Greek churches partook. Up until this point, the Ottomans had fired 5,000 shots from their cannons using 55,000 pounds of gunpowder. Criers roamed the camp to the sound of the blasting horns, rousing the Ghazis.

Shortly after midnight on Tuesday 29 May, the offensive began. The Christian troops of the Ottoman Empire attacked first, followed by successive waves of the irregular azaps, who were poorly trained and equipped and Anatolian Turkmen beylik forces who focused on a section of the damaged Blachernae walls in the north-west part of the city. This section of the walls had been built earlier, in the 11th century, and was much weaker. The Turkmen mercenaries managed to breach this section of walls and entered the city but they were just as quickly pushed back by the defenders. Finally, the last wave consisting of elite Janissaries, attacked the city walls. The Genoese general in charge of the defenders on land, Giovanni Giustiniani, was grievously wounded during the attack, and his evacuation from the ramparts caused a panic in the ranks of the defenders. (Note: Sources hostile towards the Genoese (such as the Venetian Nicolò Barbaro), however, report that Longo was only lightly wounded or not wounded at all, but, overwhelmed by fear, simulated the wound to abandon the battlefield, determining the fall of the city. These charges of cowardice and treason were so widespread that the Republic of Genoa had to deny them by sending diplomatic letters to the Chancelleries of England, France, the Duchy of Burgundy, and others. Giustiniani was carried to Chios, where he succumbed to his wounds a few days later.)

With Giustiniani's Genoese troops retreating into the city and towards the harbour, Constantine and his men, now left to their own devices, continued to hold their ground against the Janissaries. Constantine's men eventually could not prevent the Ottomans from entering the city and the defenders were overwhelmed at several points along the wall. Janissaries, led by Ulubatlı Hasan, pressed forward. Many Greek soldiers ran back home to protect their families, the Venetians retreated to their ships and a few of the Genoese escaped to Galata. The rest surrendered or committed suicide by jumping off the city walls. The Greek houses nearest to the walls were the first to suffer from the Ottomans. It is said that Constantine, throwing aside his purple imperial regalia, led the final charge against the incoming Ottomans, perishing in the ensuing battle in the streets alongside his soldiers. The Venetian Nicolò Barbaro claimed in his diary that Constantine hanged himself at the moment when the Turks broke in at the San Romano gate. Ultimately, his fate remains unknown. (Note: Barbaro added the description of the emperor's heroic last moments to his diary based on information he received afterward. According to some Ottoman sources Constantine was killed in an accidental encounter with Turkish marines a little further to the south, presumably while making his way to the Sea of Marmara in order to escape by sea.)

After the initial assault, the Ottoman army fanned out along the main thoroughfare of the city, the Mese, past the great forums and the Church of the Holy Apostles, which Mehmed II wanted to provide as a seat for his newly appointed patriarch to better control his Christian subjects. Mehmed II had sent an advance guard to protect these key buildings. The Catalans that maintained their position on the section of the wall that the emperor had assigned them, had the honor of being the last troops to fall. The sultan had Pere Julià, his sons and the consul Joan de la Via, amongst others, beheaded.

A few civilians managed to escape. When the Venetians retreated over to their ships, the Ottomans had already taken the walls of the Golden Horn. Luckily for the occupants of the city, the Ottomans were not interested in killing potentially valuable slaves, but rather in the loot they could get from raiding the city's houses, so they decided to attack the city instead. The Venetian captain ordered his men to break open the gate of the Golden Horn. Having done so, the Venetians left in ships filled with soldiers and refugees. Shortly after the Venetians left, a few Genoese ships and even the Emperor's ships followed them out of the Golden Horn. This fleet narrowly escaped prior to the Ottoman navy assuming control over the Golden Horn, which was accomplished by midday.

The army converged upon the Augusteum, the vast square that fronted the great church of Hagia Sophia whose bronze gates were barred by a huge throng of civilians inside the building, hoping for divine protection. After the doors were breached, the troops separated the congregation according to what price they might bring in the slave markets. Ottoman casualties are unknown but they are believed by most historians to be severe due to several unsuccessful Ottoman attacks made during the siege and final assault. The Venetian Barbaro observed that blood flowed in the city "like rainwater in the gutters after a sudden storm" and that bodies of Turks and Christians floated in the sea "like melons along a canal".

== Atrocities ==
According to the Encyclopædia Britannica, Mehmed II "permitted an initial period of looting that saw the destruction of many Orthodox churches", but tried to prevent a complete sack of the city. The looting was extremely thorough in certain parts of the city. On 2 June, the Sultan found the city largely deserted and half in ruins; churches had been desecrated and stripped, houses were no longer habitable, and stores and shops were emptied. He is famously reported to have been moved to tears by this, saying, "What a city we have given over to plunder and destruction."

According to David Nicolle, the ordinary people were treated better by their Ottoman conquerors than their ancestors had been by Crusaders back in 1204, stating that only about 4,000 Greeks died in the siege, while according to a Venetian Senate report, 50 Venetian noblemen and over 500 other Venetian civilians died during the siege. Many of the riches of the city were already looted in 1204, leaving only limited loot to the Ottomans.

Looting was carried out on a massive scale by sailors and marines who entered the city via other walls before they had been suppressed by regular troops, who were beyond the main gate. "Everywhere there was misfortune, everyone was touched by pain" when Mehmed entered the city. "There were lamentations and weeping in every house, screaming in the crossroads, and sorrow in all churches; the groaning of grown men and the shrieking of women accompanied looting, enslavement, separation, and rape."

If any citizens of Constantinople tried to resist, they were slaughtered. According to Niccolò Barbaro, "all through the day the Turks made a great slaughter of Christians through the city". According to Makarios Melissenos:

As soon as the Turks were inside the City, they began to seize and enslave every person who came their way; all those who tried to offer resistance were put to the sword. In many places the ground could not be seen, as it was covered by heaps of corpses.

The women of Constantinople suffered from rape at the hands of Ottoman forces. According to historian Philip Mansel, widespread persecution of the city's civilian inhabitants took place, resulting in thousands of murders and rapes.

Leonard of Chios made accounts of the atrocities that followed the fall of Constantinople stated the Ottoman invaders pillaged the city, murdered or enslaved tens of thousands of people, and raped nuns, women, and children:

All the valuables and other booty were taken to their camp, and as many as sixty thousand Christians who had been captured. The crosses which had been placed on the roofs or the walls of churches were torn down and trampled. Women were raped, virgins deflowered and youths forced to take part in shameful obscenities. The nuns left behind, even those who were obviously such, were disgraced with foul debaucheries.

According to Steven Runciman most of the elderly and the infirm/wounded and sick who were refugees inside the churches were killed, and the remainder were chained up and sold into slavery.

During three days of pillaging, the Ottoman invaders captured children and took them away to their tents, and became rich by plundering the Imperial Palace of Blachernae and the houses of Constantinople. The Ottoman official Tursun Beg wrote:

After having completely overcome the enemy, the soldiers began to plunder the city. They enslaved boys and girls and took silver and gold vessels, precious stones and all sorts of valuable goods and fabrics from the imperial palace and the houses of the rich... Every tent was filled with handsome boys and beautiful girls.

Critobulus also noted: "As for the Sultan, he was sensual rather than acquisitive, and more interested in people than in goods. Phrantzes, the faithful servant of the Basileus, has recounted the fate of his young and good-looking family. His three daughters were consigned to the Imperial harem, even the youngest, a girl of fourteen, who died there of despair. His only son John, a fifteen-year-old boy, was killed by the sultan for having repelled his advances."

George Sphrantzes says that people of both sexes were raped inside Hagia Sophia. Historian René Guerdan described the enslavement and sexual abuse committed by the Ottoman troops inside the Hagia Sophia:

Among all those outrages the profanation of Saint Sophia stood out. In the great church an immense crowd was assembled, praying despairingly. The famous bronze door had been closed, and full of anguish all awaited the conquerors. Suddenly violent blows shook and broke down the doors and a tide of blood-covered brutes swept in to the holy place. To make rooms for them they begun by using the pikes and scimitar a little; but they were in the grip of covetouness not sadism. Here, they said to themselves as they looked about, fortune awaits us. In an instant, all who were young, good-looking and healthy were stripped, despoiled and herded. High-born women, young and gentle girls of noble family, now naked under their long hair, fell thus into slavery. Their masters bound them with whatever was at hand: sashes, belts, kerchiefs, stoles, tent ropes, camel and horse reins. With blows and kicks they were herded outside into long columns, to be led to a shameful fate and to all the extremities of the Islamic world.

Mehmed entered the Hagia Sophia, "marveling at the sight" of the grand basilica. Witnessing a ghazi wildly hammering at the marble floor, he asked what he was doing. "It is for the Faith!" the ghazi said. Mehmed cut him down with his kilij: "Be satisfied with the booty and the captives; the buildings of the city belong to me."

Ottoman chroniclers confirmed: "They made the people of the city slaves and killed their emperor, and the ghazis embraced their pretty girls".

During the festivities, "and as he had promised his viziers and his other officers," Mehmed had the "wretched citizens of Constantinople" dragged before them and "ordered many of them to be hacked to pieces, for the sake of entertainment."

Byzantine historian Doukas claims that, while drunk during his victory banquet, the Sultan ordered the Grand Duke Loukas Notaras to give his youngest son, to him for his pleasure. He replied that "it would be far better for me to die than hand over my own child to be despoiled by him." Mehmed was enraged after hearing this and ordered Loukas to be executed. Before his death, Notaras supposedly said that "Him who was crucified for us, died and arose"' and urged his horrified sons to reject the advances of Mehmed and not fear the outcome. Their father's words encouraged them, and they also "were ready to die". They are also said to have been executed. However, American researcher and professor Walter G. Andrew doubts the authenticity of this story, citing the similarities with the earlier story of Saint Pelagius, he states that, "it is likely that Doukas's tale owes more to Saint Pelagius and a long history of attempts to portray Muslims as morally inferior than to anything that actually happened during the conquest of Constantinople/Istanbul."

The vast majority of the citizens of Constantinople, around 30,000 were forced to become slaves. According to Nicolas de Nicolay, slaves were displayed naked at the city's slave market, and young girls could be purchased.

== Aftermath ==
Mehmed II promised his soldiers three days of plunder, in accordance with Islamic law and the custom of the time. However subsequent sources state that he rode into the city on the first day and called an immediate halt to the looting. His soldiers obliged as very little plunder remained from the city's previous sack by crusaders. After ordering an end to the looting, Mehmet II issued a proclamation that all Christians who had avoided capture or who had been ransomed could return to their homes without further molestation, although many had no homes to return to, and many more had been taken captive and not ransomed. Byzantine historian George Sphrantzes, an eyewitness to the fall of Constantinople, described the Sultan's actions:

On the third day after the fall of our city, the Sultan celebrated his victory with a great, joyful triumph. He issued a proclamation: the citizens of all ages who had managed to escape detection were to leave their hiding places throughout the city and come out into the open, as they were to remain free and no question would be asked. He further declared the restoration of houses and property to those who had abandoned our city before the siege. If they returned home, they would be treated according to their rank and religion, as if nothing had changed.

— George Sphrantzes

Mehmed himself knocked over and trampled on the altar of the Hagia Sophia. He then ordered a muezzin to ascend the pulpit and sound a prayer. The Hagia Sophia was converted into a mosque, but the Greek Orthodox Church was allowed to remain intact and Gennadius Scholarius was appointed Patriarch of Constantinople. This was once thought to be the origin of the Ottoman millet system; however, it is now considered a myth and no such system existed in the fifteenth century.

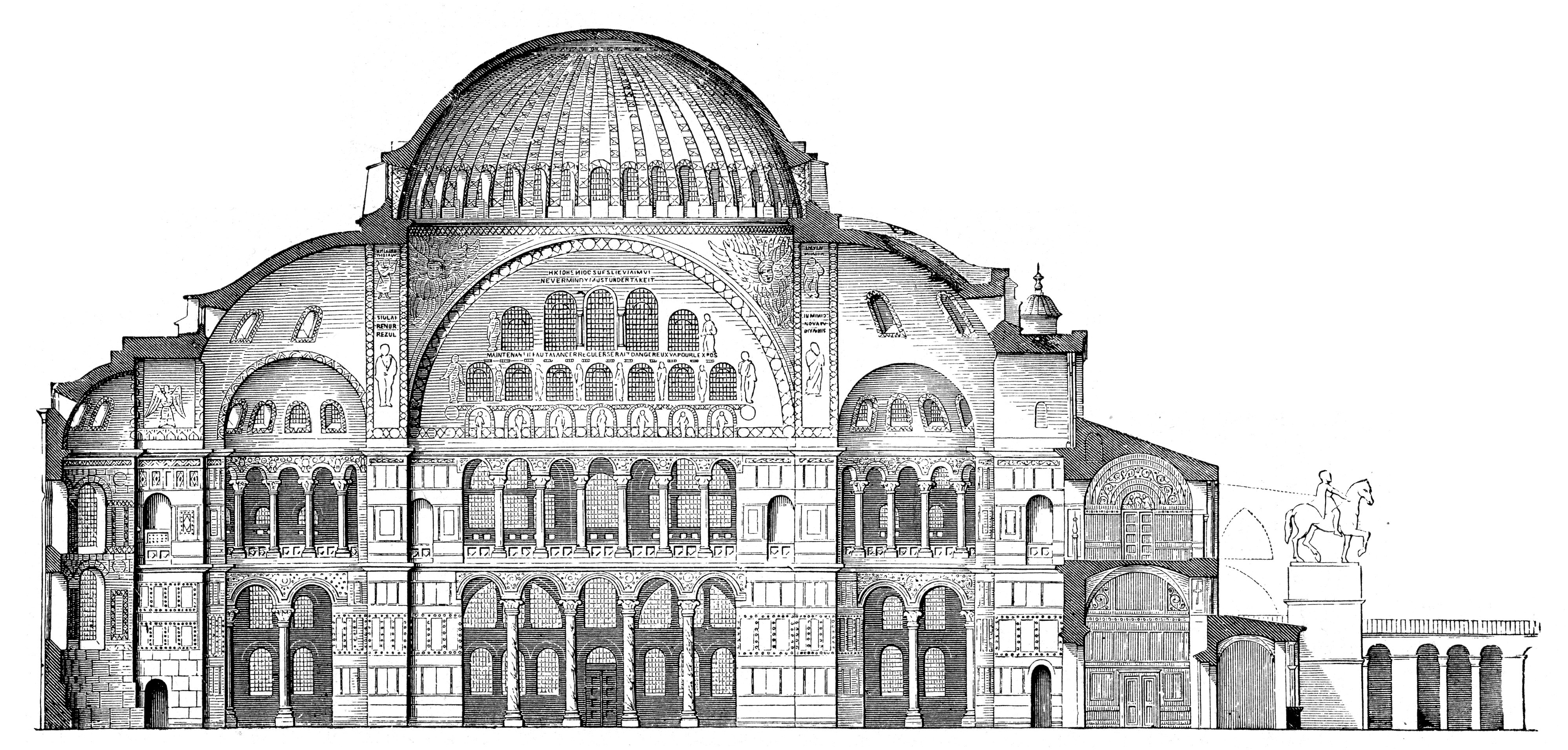
Following the city's conquest, the Church of the Holy Wisdom (the Hagia Sophia) was converted into a mosque.

The fall of Constantinople shocked many Europeans, who viewed it as a catastrophic event for their civilization. Many feared other European Christian kingdoms would suffer the same fate as Constantinople. Two possible responses emerged amongst the humanists and churchmen of that era: Crusade or dialogue. Pope Pius II strongly advocated for another Crusade, while the German Nicholas of Cusa supported engaging in a dialogue with the Ottomans.

In the past we received our wounds in Asia and in Africa—in foreign countries. This time, however, we are being attacked in Europe, in our own land, in our own house. You will protest that the Turks moved from Asia to Greece a long time ago, that the Mongols established themselves in Europe and the Arabs occupied parts of Spain, having approached through the straits of Gibraltar. We have never lost a city or a place comparable to Constantinople.

— Pope Pius II

The Morean (Peloponnesian) fortress of Mystras, where Constantine's brothers Thomas and Demetrius ruled, constantly in conflict with each other and knowing that Mehmed would eventually invade them as well, held out until 1460. Long before the fall of Constantinople, Demetrius had fought for the throne with Thomas, Constantine, and their other brothers John and Theodore. Thomas escaped to Rome when the Ottomans invaded Morea while Demetrius expected to rule a puppet state, but instead was imprisoned and remained there for the rest of his life. In Rome, Thomas and his family received some monetary support from the Pope and other Western rulers as Byzantine emperor in exile, until 1503. In 1461, the independent Byzantine state in Trebizon fell to Mehmed.

Constantine had died without producing an heir, and had Constantinople not fallen he likely would have been succeeded by the sons of his deceased elder brother, who were taken into the palace service of Mehmed after the fall of Constantinople. The oldest boy, renamed Murad, became a personal favourite of Mehmed and served as Beylerbey (Governor-General) of Rumeli (the Balkans). The younger son, renamed Mesih Pasha, became Admiral of the Ottoman fleet and Sancak Beg (Governor) of the province of Gallipoli. He eventually served twice as Grand Vizier under Mehmed's son, Bayezid II.

With the capture of Constantinople, Mehmed II had acquired the future capital of his kingdom, albeit one in decline due to years of war. The loss of the city was a crippling blow to Christendom, and it exposed the Christian West to a vigorous and aggressive foe in the East. The Christian reconquest of Constantinople remained a goal in Western Europe for many years after its fall to the Ottoman Empire. Rumours of Constantine XI's survival and subsequent rescue by an angel led many to hope that the city would one day return to Christian hands. Pope Nicholas V called for an immediate counter-attack in the form of a crusade, however no European powers wished to participate, and the Pope resorted to sending a small fleet of 10 ships to defend the city. The short lived Crusade immediately came to an end and as Western Europe entered the 16th century, the age of Crusading began to come to an end.

For some time Greek scholars had gone to Italian city-states, a cultural exchange begun in 1396 by Coluccio Salutati, chancellor of Florence, who had invited Manuel Chrysoloras, to lecture at the University of Florence. After the conquest many Greeks, such as John Argyropoulos and Constantine Lascaris, fled the city and found refuge in the Latin West, bringing with them knowledge and documents from the Greco-Roman tradition to Italy and other regions that further propelled the Renaissance. Those Greeks who stayed behind in Constantinople mostly lived in the Phanar and Galata districts of the city. The Phanariotes, as they were called, provided many capable advisers to the Ottoman rulers.

A severed head that was claimed to belong to Constantine was found and presented to Mehmed and nailed onto a column. While standing before the head, the sultan in his speech said:

Fellow soldiers, this one thing was lacking to make the glory of such a victory complete. Now, at this happy and joyful moment of time, we have the riches of the Greeks, we have won their empire, and their religion is completely extinguished. Our ancestors eagerly desired to achieve this; rejoice now since it is your bravery which has won this kingdom for us.

The news spread rapidly across the Islamic world. In Egypt "good tidings were proclaimed, and Cairo decorated" to celebrate "this greatest of conquests." The Sharif of Mecca wrote to Mehmed, calling the Sultan "the one who has aided Islam and the Muslims, the Sultan of all kings and sultans". The fact that Constantinople, which was long "known for being indomitable in the eyes of all," as the Sharif of Mecca said, had fallen and that Muhammad's prophecy came true shocked the Islamic world and filled it with a great jubilation and rapture.

=== Third Rome ===
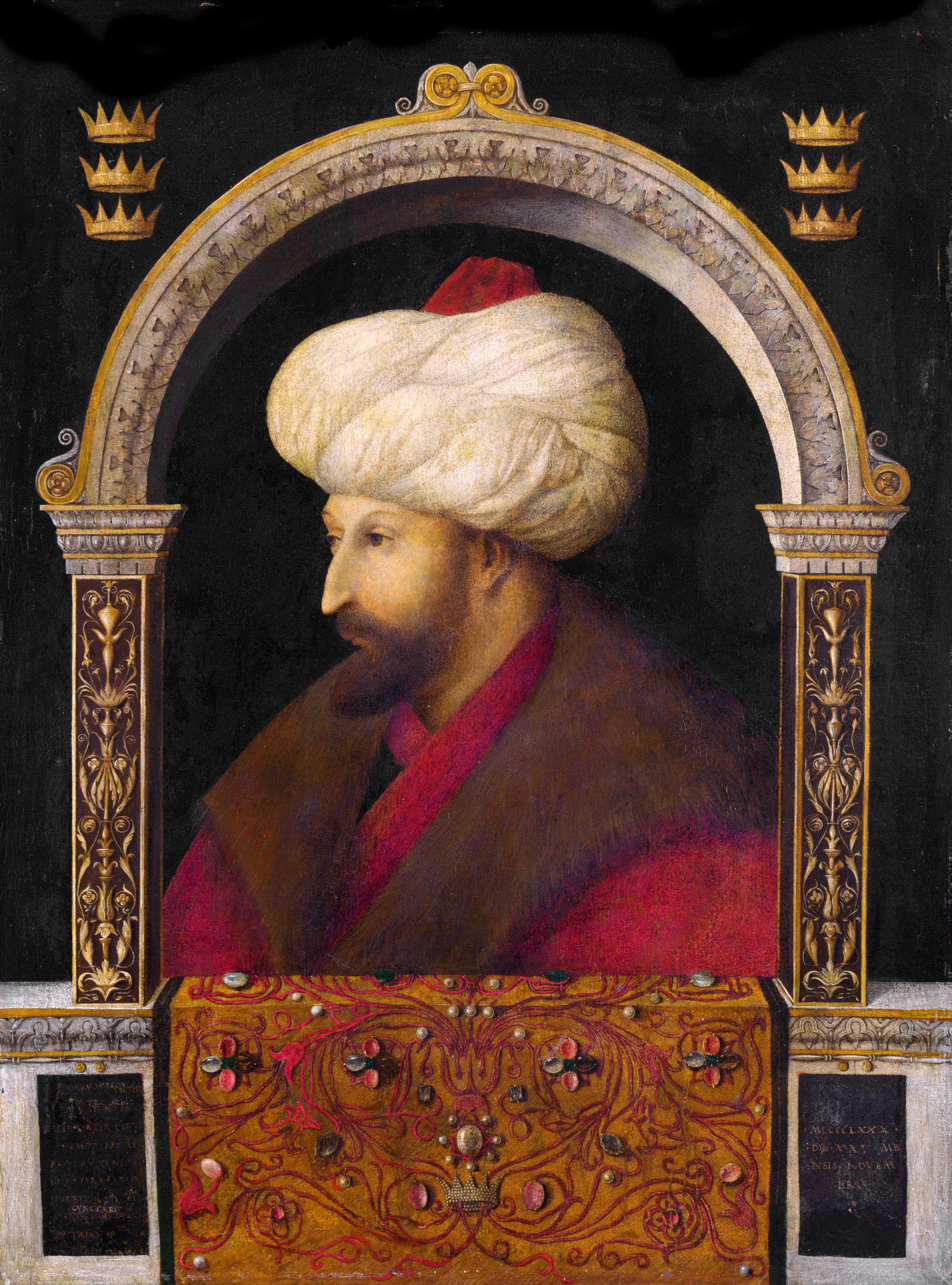
Mehmed II by Gentile Bellini

Byzantium is a term used by modern historians to refer to the later Roman Empire. In its own time, the Empire ruled from Constantinople (or "New Rome) and was simply considered as "the Roman Empire." The fall of Constantinople led competing factions to lay claim to being the inheritors of the Imperial mantle. Russian claims to Byzantine heritage clashed with those of the Ottoman Empire's own claim. In Mehmed's view, he was the successor to the Roman Emperor, declaring himself Kayser-i Rum, literally "Caesar of the Romans", that is, of the Roman Empire, though he was remembered as "the Conqueror".

Stefan Dušan, Tsar of Serbia, and Ivan Alexander, Tsar of Bulgaria, both made similar claims, regarding themselves as legitimate heirs to the Roman Empire. Other potential claimants, such as the Republic of Venice and the Holy Roman Empire, have disintegrated into history.

=== Impact on the Churches ===
Pope Pius II believed that the Ottomans would persecute Greek Orthodox Christians and advocated for another crusade at the Council of Mantua in 1459.

== Legacy ==
=== Legends ===
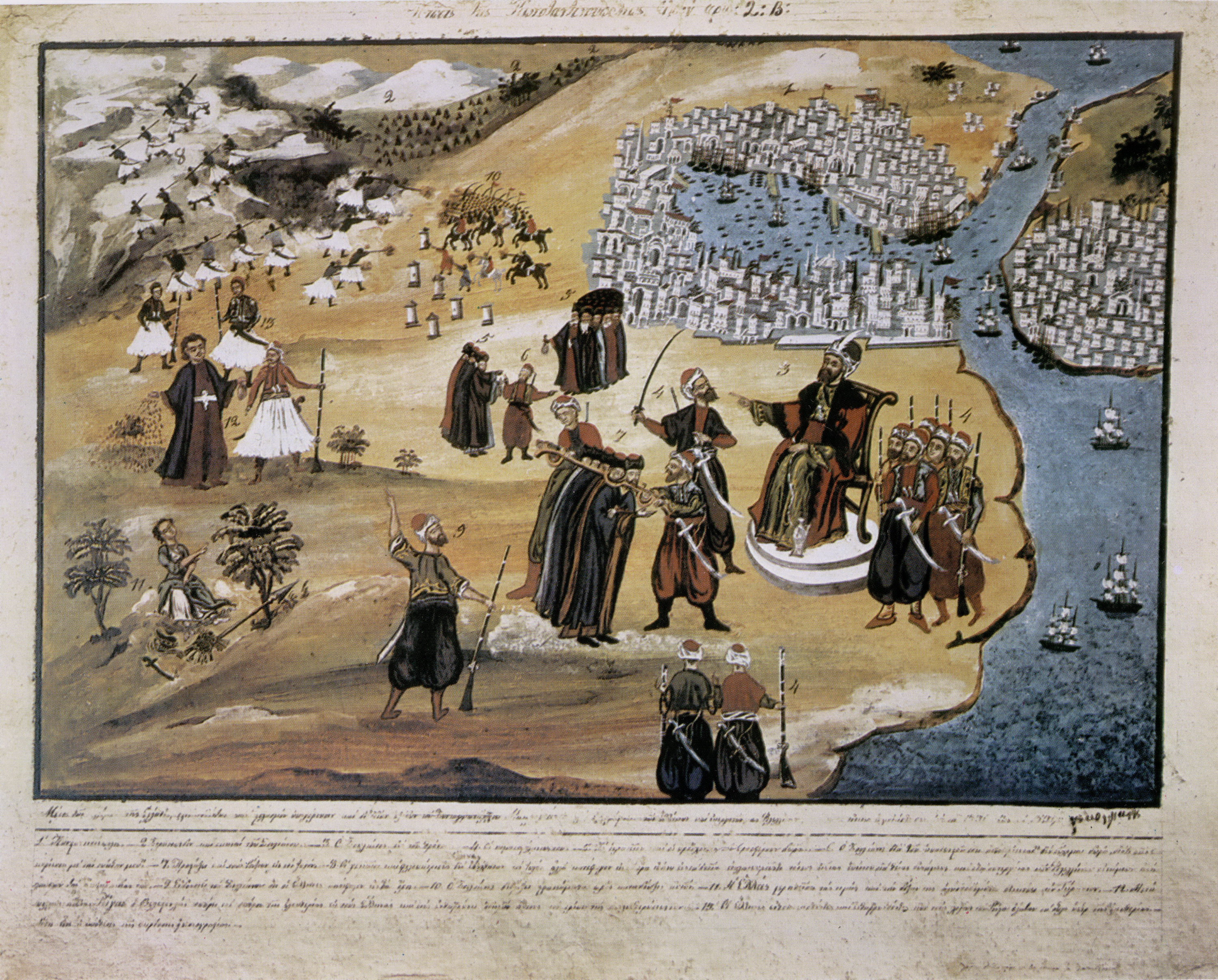
Anachronistic fanciful depiction of the siege and fall of Constantinople in 1453 by Panagiotis Zographos, under the guidance of Yannis Makriyannis. On the left, Rigas Feraios is seen giving a speech to the soldiers, who are depicted wearing traditional Greek garments from the Greek War of Independence. On the right, the painting depicts Sultan Mehmed II and his men.

There are many legends in Greece surrounding the Fall of Constantinople. It was said that the partial lunar eclipse that occurred on 22 May 1453 represented a fulfilment of a prophecy of the city's demise.

Four days later, the whole city was blotted out by a thick fog, a condition unknown in that part of the world in May. When the fog lifted that evening, a strange light was seen playing about the dome of the Hagia Sophia, which some interpreted as the Holy Spirit departing from the city. "This evidently indicated the departure of the Divine Presence, and its leaving the City in total abandonment and desertion, for the Divinity conceals itself in cloud and appears and again disappears."

For others, there was still a distant hope that the lights were the campfires of the troops of John Hunyadi who had come to relieve the city. It is possible that all these phenomena were local effects of the cataclysmic 1452/1453 mystery eruption which occurred around the time of the siege. The "fire" seen may have been an optical illusion due to the reflection of intensely red twilight glow by clouds of volcanic ash high in the atmosphere.

Another legend holds that two priests saying divine liturgy over the crowd disappeared into the cathedral's walls as the first Turkish soldiers entered. According to the legend, the priests will appear again on the day that Constantinople returns to Christian hands. Another legend refers to the Marble Emperor (Constantine), holding that an angel rescued the emperor when the Ottomans entered the city, turning him into marble and placing him in a cave under the earth near the Golden Gate, where he waits to be brought to life again (a variant of the sleeping hero legend). However, many of the myths surrounding the disappearance of Constantine were developed later and little evidence can be found to support them even in friendly primary accounts of the siege.

=== Cultural impact ===
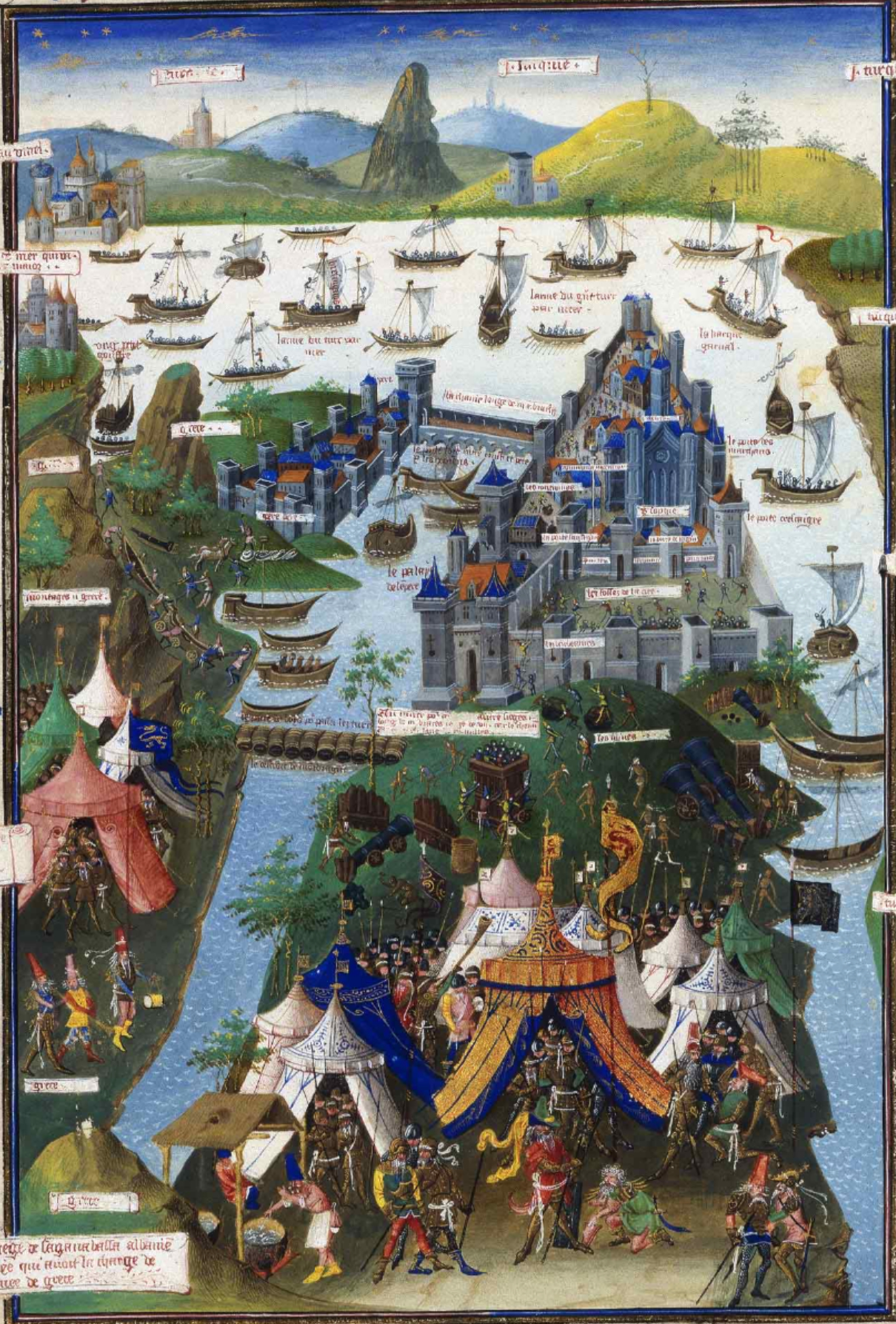
The siege of Constantinople (1453), French miniature by Jean Le Tavernier after 1455

Guillaume Dufay composed several songs lamenting the fall of the Eastern church, and the Duke of Burgundy, Philip the Good, avowed to take up arms against the Turks. However, as the growing Ottoman power from this date on coincided with the Protestant Reformation and subsequent Counter-Reformation, the recapture of Constantinople became an ever-distant dream. Even France, once a fervent participant in the Crusades, became an ally of the Ottomans.

Nonetheless, depictions of Christian coalitions taking the city and of the late Emperor's resurrection by Leo the Wise persisted.

29 May 1453, the day of the fall of Constantinople, fell on a Tuesday, and since then Tuesday has been considered an unlucky day by Greeks generally.

=== Impact on the Renaissance ===
The migration waves of Byzantine scholars and émigrés in the period following the sacking of Constantinople and the fall of Constantinople in 1453 is considered by many scholars key to the revival of Greek and Roman studies that led to the development of the Renaissance humanism and science. These émigrés were grammarians, humanists, poets, writers, printers, lecturers, musicians, astronomers, architects, academics, artists, scribes, philosophers, scientists, politicians and theologians. They brought to Western Europe the far greater preserved and accumulated knowledge of Byzantine civilization. According to the Encyclopædia Britannica: "Many modern scholars also agree that the exodus of Greeks to Italy as a result of this event marked the end of the Middle Ages and the beginning of the Renaissance".

=== Renaming of the city ===
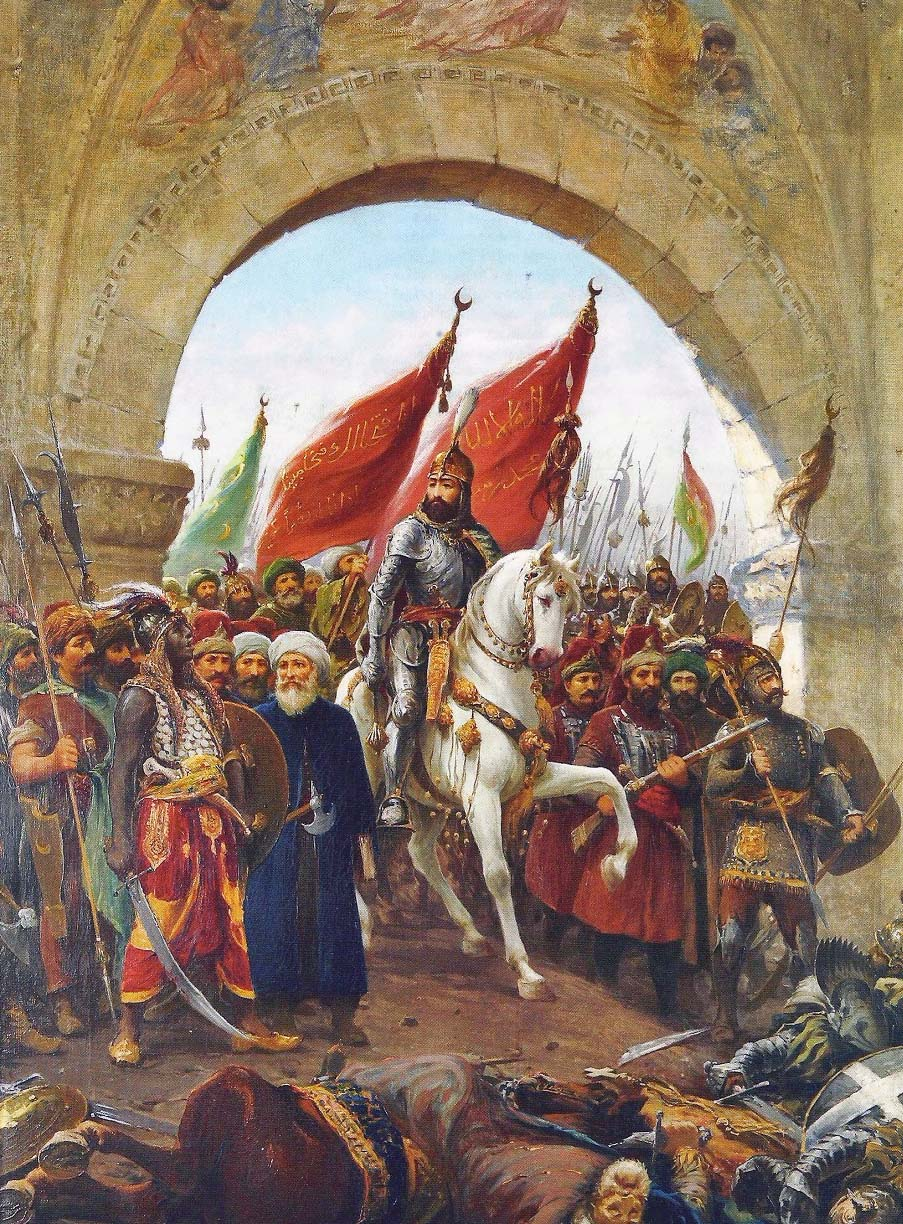
Mehmed the Conqueror enters Constantinople. Painting by Fausto Zonaro.

Ottomans used the Arabic transliteration of the city's name "Qosṭanṭīniyye" (القسطنطينية) or "Kostantiniyye", as can be seen in numerous Ottoman documents. Islambol (اسلامبول, Full of Islam) or Islambul (find Islam) or Islam(b)ol (old Turkic: be Islam), both in Turkish, were folk-etymological adaptations of Istanbul created after the Ottoman conquest of 1453 to express the city's new role as the capital of the Islamic Ottoman Empire. It is first attested shortly after the conquest, and its invention was ascribed by some contemporary writers to Mehmed II himself.

The name of Istanbul is thought to be derived from the Greek phrase īs tīmbolī(n) (Greek: εἰς τὴν πόλιν, translit. eis tēn pólin, "to the City"), and it is claimed that it had already spread among the Turkish populace of the Ottoman Empire before the conquest. However, Istanbul only became the official name of the city in 1930 by the revised Turkish Postal Law.

=== Commemoration ===
The Fall of Constantinople is commemorated and lamented in Greece, albeit in a limited way. In 2021, the President of Greece, Katerina Sakellaropoulou, laid a wreath at the statue of Constantine XI Palaiologos, in a small ceremony at the town of Mystras, Peloponnese, where Constantine ruled until moving to Constantinople in 1449.

== Primary sources ==
For the fall of Constantinople, Marios Philippides and Walter Hanak list 15 eyewitness accounts (13 Christian and 2 Turkish) and 20 contemporary non-eyewitness accounts (13 Italian).

=== Eyewitness accounts ===
1. Mehmed Şems el-Mille ve'd Din, Sufi holy man who gives an account in a letter
2. Tursun Beg, wrote a history entitled Tarih-i Abu'l Fath
3. George Sphrantzes, the only Greek eyewitness who wrote about it, but his laconic account is almost entirely lacking in narrative
4. Leonard of Chios, wrote a report to Pope Nicholas V
5. Nicolò Barbaro, physician on a Venetian galley who kept a journal
6. Angelino Giovanni Lomellini, Genoese podestà of Pera who wrote a report dated 24 June 1453
7. Jacopo Tetaldi, Florentine merchant
8. Isidore of Kiev, Eastern Catholic churchman who wrote eight letters to Italy
9. Benvenuto, Anconitan consul in Constantinople
10. Ubertino Puscolo, Italian poet learning Greek in the city, wrote an epic poem
11. Eparkhos and Diplovatatzes, two refugees whose accounts has become garbled through multiple translations
12. Nestor Iskander, youthful eyewitness who wrote a Slavonic account
13. Samile the Vladik, bishop who, like Eparkhos and Diplovatatzes, fled as a refugee to Wallachia
14. Konstantin Mihailović, Serbian who fought on the Ottoman side
15. a report by some Franciscan prisoners of war who later came to Bologna

=== Non-eyewitness accounts ===
1. Doukas, a Byzantine Greek historian, one of the most important sources for the last decades and eventual fall of the Byzantine Empire to the Ottomans
2. Laonikos Chalkokondyles, a Byzantine Greek historian
3. Michael Kritoboulos, a Byzantine Greek historian
4. Makarios Melissourgos, 16th-century historian who augmented the account of Sphrantzes, not very reliably
5. Paolo Dotti, Venetian official on Crete whose account is based on oral reports
6. Fra Girolamo's letter from Crete to Domenico Capranica
7. Lauro Quirini, wrote a report to Pope Nicholas V from Crete based on oral reports
8. Aeneas Silvius Piccolomini (Pope Pius II), wrote an account based on written sources
9. Henry of Soemmern, wrote a letter dated 11 September 1453 in which he cites his sources of information
10. Niccola della Tuccia, whose Cronaca di Viterbo written in the autumn of 1453 contains unique information
11. Niccolò Tignosi da Foligno, Expugnatio Constantinopolitana, part of a letter to a friend
12. Filippo da Rimini, Excidium Constantinopolitanae urbis quae quondam Bizantium ferebatur
13. Antonio Ivani da Sarzana, Expugnatio Constantinopolitana, part of a letter to the duke of Urbino
14. Nikolaos Sekoundinos, read a report before the Venetian Senate, the Pope and the Neapolitan court
15. Giacomo Languschi, whose account is embedded in the Venetian chronicle of Zorzi Dolfin, had access to eyewitnesses
16. John Moskhos, wrote a poem in honour of Loukas Notaras
17. Adamo di Montaldo, De Constantinopolitano excidio ad nobilissimum iuvenem Melladucam Cicadam, which contains unique information
18. Ashikpashazade, included a chapter on the conquest in his Tarih-i al-i Osman
19. Neshri, included a chapter on the conquest in his universal history
20. Evliya Çelebi, 17th-century traveller who collected local traditions of the conquest
