= Gabriele Orsini del Balzo =

Italian Duke, Count, general and mercenary (1404-1453)

Gabriele Orsini del Balzo Duke of Venosa
- Born: 1404; Principality of Taranto
- Died: May 29, 1453 (aged 48–49); Constantinople, Byzantine Empire
- Relatives: Orsini del Balzo family
- Military career
- Allegiance: Byzantine Empire
- Rank: Condottiero
- Conflicts: Byzantine–Ottoman wars; Siege of Constantinople †

Gabriele Orsini del Balzo (1404 - May 29, 1453) was an Italian Duke, Count, military general, mercenary, and member of the Orsini del Balzo family of Taranto. He was killed during the Siege of Constantinople in 1453.

== Early life ==
Gabriele was born in 1404 to Raimondo Orsini del Balzo (1350/1355-1406) and Mary of Enghien (1367/1370-1446). His older brother and sister, Giovanni Antonio Orsini del Balzo and Catherine of Taranto, Countess of Copertino, inherited their father's possessions except for the paternal fiefs of Altamura and Minervino in June 1399. After this, the family moved to Naples until 1414 when Ladislaus died. Ladislaus was succeeded by his sister Joanna II of Anjou-Valois, who had Maria and her children imprisoned, only freed in 1416 (Maria) and in 1418 (her sons Giannantonio and Gabriele) after the intercession of James II of Bourbon-La Marche, married by Joanna in 1415, who had also married one of Maria's daughters, Caterina, to one of his knights, Tristano di Chiaromonte. In particular, for the liberation of Gabriele, Maria had to pay 8,000 ducats to the court of Naples. The possessions of the Orsini del Balzo that had not yet been assigned (that is, the territories owned by Raimondello except the principality of Taranto which was assigned to Giacomo II) were returned to Maria and her firstborn Giannantonio thanks also to the intercession of the Papacy.

== Later Years ==
In 1420 Giacomo renounced the principality which was then assigned to Giannantonio. In 1421 an agreement was reached between Maria and her two sons on the division of the family fiefdoms: Maria was confirmed with her fiefdoms in Salento, while Gabriele received the baronies of Acerra, Flumeri-Trevico, Lavello and Minervino as fiefdoms from Giannantonio.

In 1431, Maria Caracciolo del Sole, the daughter of Giovanni Caracciolo, prince of Capua and grand seneschal of the Kingdom of Naples. Upon Giovanni's death, Troiano Caracciolo, on the orders of the sovereign, handed over the Venosa duchy to Gabriele. In 1434 Giannantonio donated the county of Ugento to Gabriele, while an agreement supervised by Alfonso V dates back to 1435, according to which each of the two brothers was guaranteed reciprocal succession in their fiefdoms in the event of death without male heirs of one of the two. In the following years Gabriele's policy followed the course of events in the principality of Taranto led by his brother Giannantonio. In particular he participated in the support of the Orsini del Balzo in favour of the Aragonese against Renato d'Angiò-Valois in the struggle for the control of southern Italy, both by providing troops to the Aragonese army and in the diplomatic sphere to bring other Neapolitan barons to the side of Alfonso.

With Alfonso's conquest of the Kingdom of Naples, formally concluded in 1443, his supporters were rewarded by the Aragonese. Gabriele was initially granted the castle of Montemilone, at the time occupied by Ladislao Marchesani, but he repented of his past alongside the Angevins and the territories were returned to him. Ladislao then died three years later, in 1445, and the castle was given to Gabriele.

Gabriele died during the siege of Constantinople in 1453, where he had arrived together with 200 Neapolitan archers in the vain defence of the capital of the Byzantine Empire, besieged by the Ottoman troops of Mehmet II. Having left no male heirs, his possessions were transferred to his daughter Maria Donata despite the succession agreement in favour of her brother in 1435.
