= Leonard of Chios =

Catholic Bishop

Leonard of Chios (Greek: Λεονάρδος ο Χίος; Italian: Leonardo di Chio), also called Leonardo Giustiniani, was a Greek scholar of the Dominican Order and Latin Bishop of Mytilene, best known for his eye-witness account of the Fall of Constantinople in 1453, which is one of the main sources for the event.

== Biography ==
Leonard was born on the Aegean island of Chios, then under Genoese domination (cf. Maona of Chios), in c. 1395/6. According to his own account, he was of humble parents. He entered the Dominican Order in Chios, and after profession was sent to the University of Padua for his philosophical and theological studies. After ordination he taught at both Padua and Genoa, then at the request of Maria Giustiniani returned to his native island, and was made Bishop of Mytilene on the island of Lesbos by Pope Eugene IV. There he enjoyed a close relationship with the Gattilusii, the Genoese rulers of Lesbos.

In 1452, Cardinal Isidore of Kiev stopped at Lesbos on his way to Constantinople to conduct negotiations for a union between the Catholic and Greek Orthodox churches. Stopping on Lesbos, Isidore invited Leonard to join him. The latter accepted, and arrived at Constantinople with the papal delegation on 26 October 1452. As a result, he was an eyewitness of the subsequent siege and capture of Constantinople by the Ottoman Sultan Mehmed II in May 1453. It is not known what role he played in the defence; he evidently accompanied Cardinal Isidore, and thus participated both in the councils of the defenders, and in the defence of the sector of Saint Demetrios, that Isidore commanded. During the sack of the city on 29 May, both Isidore and Leonard were captured, but soon were released or ransomed. Leonard was even able to buy some books from the looting Turks on the same day of the sack.

Leonard soon managed to find passage to Chios, from where on 16 August he wrote to Pope Nicholas V a detailed account of the fall of Constantinople in a letter. Written in Latin, Leonard's letter "describes the conquest in a fashion hostile to the Byzantines and Venetians but favorable to the Genoese". It "remains our basic source for the event" to this day, and was reprinted several times in subsequent centuries, translated into Venetian and vernacular Greek, and was used as a source, or outright copied, by several other authors.

His later life is not well documented. Thus it was long believed that he returned to his see at Mytilene, and remained there until the Ottoman conquest of Lesbos in 1462, when he was captured anew. A Latin work describing the siege and capture of Mytilene, De Lesbo a Turcis capta, was long attributed to him, but stylistical differences suggest a different author. Modern scholarship considers that Leonard returned to Italy to campaign for a Christian alliance against the Ottomans, and that he died there in c. 1458. His successor to the see of Mytilene, Benedetto, was nominated in December 1459, and is the likely author of De Lesbo a Turcis capta.

== Works ==
His best-known writings is the letter mentioned above and an apologetical tract in answer to the humanist Gian Francesco Poggio Bracciolini. Both tracts with biographical sketches were edited by Michael Justinian (Avila, 1657). There is reason to believe that many of his letters remain unedited in the Vatican Library.

== Sources ==
- Smith, Ignatius (1910). "Leonard of Chios". In Herbermann, Charles (ed.). Catholic Encyclopedia. Vol. 9. New York: Robert Appleton Company.
- Kazhdan, Alexander, ed. (1991). The Oxford Dictionary of Byzantium. Oxford and New York: Oxford University Press. ISBN 0-19-504652-8.
- Philippides, Marios; Hanak, Walter K. (2011). The Siege and the Fall of Constantinople in 1453: Historiography, Topography and Military Studies. Ashgate Publishing, Ltd. ISBN 978-1409410645.

Catholic Church titles
Preceded by Doroteo	Bishop of Mytilene; 1444–1458/59	Succeeded by Benedetto
